

41001–41100 

|-bgcolor=#d6d6d6
| 41001 ||  || — || October 29, 1999 || Catalina || CSS || VER || align=right | 8.3 km || 
|-id=002 bgcolor=#d6d6d6
| 41002 ||  || — || October 29, 1999 || Catalina || CSS || — || align=right | 5.2 km || 
|-id=003 bgcolor=#fefefe
| 41003 ||  || — || October 29, 1999 || Catalina || CSS || — || align=right | 5.5 km || 
|-id=004 bgcolor=#E9E9E9
| 41004 ||  || — || October 29, 1999 || Catalina || CSS || — || align=right | 5.7 km || 
|-id=005 bgcolor=#fefefe
| 41005 ||  || — || October 29, 1999 || Catalina || CSS || — || align=right | 2.7 km || 
|-id=006 bgcolor=#E9E9E9
| 41006 ||  || — || October 29, 1999 || Catalina || CSS || — || align=right | 2.4 km || 
|-id=007 bgcolor=#E9E9E9
| 41007 ||  || — || October 29, 1999 || Catalina || CSS || — || align=right | 2.6 km || 
|-id=008 bgcolor=#d6d6d6
| 41008 ||  || — || October 29, 1999 || Catalina || CSS || — || align=right | 5.3 km || 
|-id=009 bgcolor=#d6d6d6
| 41009 ||  || — || October 29, 1999 || Catalina || CSS || — || align=right | 9.2 km || 
|-id=010 bgcolor=#d6d6d6
| 41010 ||  || — || October 29, 1999 || Catalina || CSS || KOR || align=right | 3.6 km || 
|-id=011 bgcolor=#d6d6d6
| 41011 ||  || — || October 29, 1999 || Catalina || CSS || KOR || align=right | 3.5 km || 
|-id=012 bgcolor=#d6d6d6
| 41012 ||  || — || October 30, 1999 || Catalina || CSS || HYG || align=right | 7.3 km || 
|-id=013 bgcolor=#E9E9E9
| 41013 ||  || — || October 31, 1999 || Kitt Peak || Spacewatch || — || align=right | 2.5 km || 
|-id=014 bgcolor=#d6d6d6
| 41014 ||  || — || October 28, 1999 || Catalina || CSS || — || align=right | 10 km || 
|-id=015 bgcolor=#d6d6d6
| 41015 ||  || — || October 28, 1999 || Catalina || CSS || — || align=right | 11 km || 
|-id=016 bgcolor=#d6d6d6
| 41016 ||  || — || October 28, 1999 || Catalina || CSS || EOS || align=right | 4.9 km || 
|-id=017 bgcolor=#E9E9E9
| 41017 ||  || — || October 30, 1999 || Catalina || CSS || — || align=right | 7.1 km || 
|-id=018 bgcolor=#d6d6d6
| 41018 ||  || — || October 31, 1999 || Catalina || CSS || — || align=right | 6.6 km || 
|-id=019 bgcolor=#d6d6d6
| 41019 ||  || — || October 31, 1999 || Kitt Peak || Spacewatch || — || align=right | 4.7 km || 
|-id=020 bgcolor=#fefefe
| 41020 ||  || — || October 31, 1999 || Kitt Peak || Spacewatch || — || align=right | 1.6 km || 
|-id=021 bgcolor=#d6d6d6
| 41021 ||  || — || October 31, 1999 || Kitt Peak || Spacewatch || — || align=right | 4.5 km || 
|-id=022 bgcolor=#E9E9E9
| 41022 ||  || — || October 16, 1999 || Kitt Peak || Spacewatch || — || align=right | 2.6 km || 
|-id=023 bgcolor=#d6d6d6
| 41023 ||  || — || October 29, 1999 || Anderson Mesa || LONEOS || HYG || align=right | 7.2 km || 
|-id=024 bgcolor=#E9E9E9
| 41024 ||  || — || October 29, 1999 || Anderson Mesa || LONEOS || NEM || align=right | 7.0 km || 
|-id=025 bgcolor=#E9E9E9
| 41025 ||  || — || October 29, 1999 || Anderson Mesa || LONEOS || PAD || align=right | 7.3 km || 
|-id=026 bgcolor=#d6d6d6
| 41026 ||  || — || October 16, 1999 || Socorro || LINEAR || — || align=right | 7.7 km || 
|-id=027 bgcolor=#E9E9E9
| 41027 ||  || — || October 30, 1999 || Anderson Mesa || LONEOS || — || align=right | 4.8 km || 
|-id=028 bgcolor=#E9E9E9
| 41028 ||  || — || October 31, 1999 || Catalina || CSS || MAR || align=right | 2.8 km || 
|-id=029 bgcolor=#d6d6d6
| 41029 ||  || — || October 31, 1999 || Catalina || CSS || EOS || align=right | 4.6 km || 
|-id=030 bgcolor=#E9E9E9
| 41030 Mariawomack ||  ||  || October 31, 1999 || Anderson Mesa || LONEOS || MAR || align=right | 4.4 km || 
|-id=031 bgcolor=#d6d6d6
| 41031 ||  || — || October 29, 1999 || Catalina || CSS || EOS || align=right | 6.6 km || 
|-id=032 bgcolor=#d6d6d6
| 41032 ||  || — || October 30, 1999 || Catalina || CSS || — || align=right | 7.2 km || 
|-id=033 bgcolor=#E9E9E9
| 41033 ||  || — || October 31, 1999 || Catalina || CSS || MAR || align=right | 3.8 km || 
|-id=034 bgcolor=#d6d6d6
| 41034 ||  || — || October 31, 1999 || Catalina || CSS || — || align=right | 6.6 km || 
|-id=035 bgcolor=#E9E9E9
| 41035 ||  || — || October 30, 1999 || Catalina || CSS || — || align=right | 6.5 km || 
|-id=036 bgcolor=#d6d6d6
| 41036 ||  || — || October 31, 1999 || Catalina || CSS || — || align=right | 8.5 km || 
|-id=037 bgcolor=#E9E9E9
| 41037 ||  || — || October 31, 1999 || Kitt Peak || Spacewatch || fast? || align=right | 3.7 km || 
|-id=038 bgcolor=#d6d6d6
| 41038 ||  || — || October 31, 1999 || Catalina || CSS || EOS || align=right | 6.5 km || 
|-id=039 bgcolor=#d6d6d6
| 41039 ||  || — || October 29, 1999 || Catalina || CSS || slow || align=right | 5.3 km || 
|-id=040 bgcolor=#d6d6d6
| 41040 || 1999 VR || — || November 2, 1999 || Oohira || T. Urata || THM || align=right | 7.5 km || 
|-id=041 bgcolor=#E9E9E9
| 41041 ||  || — || November 4, 1999 || Gekko || T. Kagawa || — || align=right | 5.0 km || 
|-id=042 bgcolor=#d6d6d6
| 41042 ||  || — || November 3, 1999 || Dynic || A. Sugie || EUP || align=right | 18 km || 
|-id=043 bgcolor=#E9E9E9
| 41043 ||  || — || November 5, 1999 || Višnjan Observatory || K. Korlević || — || align=right | 3.4 km || 
|-id=044 bgcolor=#E9E9E9
| 41044 ||  || — || November 8, 1999 || Fountain Hills || C. W. Juels || — || align=right | 5.9 km || 
|-id=045 bgcolor=#E9E9E9
| 41045 ||  || — || November 8, 1999 || Fountain Hills || C. W. Juels || — || align=right | 5.9 km || 
|-id=046 bgcolor=#d6d6d6
| 41046 ||  || — || November 8, 1999 || Fountain Hills || C. W. Juels || — || align=right | 7.1 km || 
|-id=047 bgcolor=#E9E9E9
| 41047 ||  || — || November 7, 1999 || Višnjan Observatory || K. Korlević || — || align=right | 3.2 km || 
|-id=048 bgcolor=#d6d6d6
| 41048 ||  || — || November 7, 1999 || Višnjan Observatory || K. Korlević || — || align=right | 6.2 km || 
|-id=049 bgcolor=#E9E9E9
| 41049 Van Citters ||  ||  || November 9, 1999 || Fountain Hills || C. W. Juels || — || align=right | 4.3 km || 
|-id=050 bgcolor=#E9E9E9
| 41050 ||  || — || November 8, 1999 || Višnjan Observatory || K. Korlević || — || align=right | 5.4 km || 
|-id=051 bgcolor=#d6d6d6
| 41051 ||  || — || November 9, 1999 || Oizumi || T. Kobayashi || EOS || align=right | 11 km || 
|-id=052 bgcolor=#E9E9E9
| 41052 ||  || — || November 2, 1999 || Kitt Peak || Spacewatch || — || align=right | 6.7 km || 
|-id=053 bgcolor=#d6d6d6
| 41053 ||  || — || November 2, 1999 || Kitt Peak || Spacewatch || — || align=right | 8.4 km || 
|-id=054 bgcolor=#E9E9E9
| 41054 ||  || — || November 2, 1999 || Kitt Peak || Spacewatch || — || align=right | 4.5 km || 
|-id=055 bgcolor=#d6d6d6
| 41055 ||  || — || November 10, 1999 || Višnjan Observatory || K. Korlević || — || align=right | 6.3 km || 
|-id=056 bgcolor=#E9E9E9
| 41056 ||  || — || November 9, 1999 || Monte Agliale || M. Ziboli || GEF || align=right | 4.5 km || 
|-id=057 bgcolor=#d6d6d6
| 41057 ||  || — || November 12, 1999 || Farpoint || G. Hug, G. Bell || — || align=right | 6.5 km || 
|-id=058 bgcolor=#d6d6d6
| 41058 ||  || — || November 8, 1999 || Majorca || R. Pacheco, Á. López J. || HYG || align=right | 8.6 km || 
|-id=059 bgcolor=#d6d6d6
| 41059 ||  || — || November 3, 1999 || Socorro || LINEAR || — || align=right | 6.6 km || 
|-id=060 bgcolor=#d6d6d6
| 41060 ||  || — || November 3, 1999 || Socorro || LINEAR || KOR || align=right | 3.9 km || 
|-id=061 bgcolor=#E9E9E9
| 41061 ||  || — || November 3, 1999 || Socorro || LINEAR || PAD || align=right | 6.9 km || 
|-id=062 bgcolor=#d6d6d6
| 41062 ||  || — || November 3, 1999 || Socorro || LINEAR || THM || align=right | 7.3 km || 
|-id=063 bgcolor=#E9E9E9
| 41063 ||  || — || November 3, 1999 || Socorro || LINEAR || — || align=right | 5.7 km || 
|-id=064 bgcolor=#d6d6d6
| 41064 ||  || — || November 3, 1999 || Socorro || LINEAR || THM || align=right | 7.6 km || 
|-id=065 bgcolor=#d6d6d6
| 41065 ||  || — || November 3, 1999 || Socorro || LINEAR || KOR || align=right | 3.9 km || 
|-id=066 bgcolor=#E9E9E9
| 41066 ||  || — || November 3, 1999 || Socorro || LINEAR || — || align=right | 5.1 km || 
|-id=067 bgcolor=#d6d6d6
| 41067 ||  || — || November 3, 1999 || Socorro || LINEAR || — || align=right | 8.3 km || 
|-id=068 bgcolor=#d6d6d6
| 41068 ||  || — || November 3, 1999 || Socorro || LINEAR || — || align=right | 3.0 km || 
|-id=069 bgcolor=#d6d6d6
| 41069 ||  || — || November 3, 1999 || Socorro || LINEAR || — || align=right | 3.8 km || 
|-id=070 bgcolor=#d6d6d6
| 41070 ||  || — || November 3, 1999 || Socorro || LINEAR || — || align=right | 9.8 km || 
|-id=071 bgcolor=#E9E9E9
| 41071 ||  || — || November 3, 1999 || Socorro || LINEAR || — || align=right | 5.4 km || 
|-id=072 bgcolor=#d6d6d6
| 41072 ||  || — || November 10, 1999 || Socorro || LINEAR || — || align=right | 6.3 km || 
|-id=073 bgcolor=#d6d6d6
| 41073 ||  || — || November 10, 1999 || Socorro || LINEAR || — || align=right | 5.4 km || 
|-id=074 bgcolor=#FA8072
| 41074 ||  || — || November 13, 1999 || Anderson Mesa || LONEOS || — || align=right | 3.8 km || 
|-id=075 bgcolor=#d6d6d6
| 41075 ||  || — || November 1, 1999 || Catalina || CSS || KOR || align=right | 3.2 km || 
|-id=076 bgcolor=#d6d6d6
| 41076 ||  || — || November 1, 1999 || Catalina || CSS || — || align=right | 6.9 km || 
|-id=077 bgcolor=#d6d6d6
| 41077 ||  || — || November 1, 1999 || Catalina || CSS || — || align=right | 5.7 km || 
|-id=078 bgcolor=#d6d6d6
| 41078 ||  || — || November 3, 1999 || Catalina || CSS || — || align=right | 7.2 km || 
|-id=079 bgcolor=#E9E9E9
| 41079 ||  || — || November 4, 1999 || Catalina || CSS || HOF || align=right | 9.2 km || 
|-id=080 bgcolor=#d6d6d6
| 41080 ||  || — || November 4, 1999 || Catalina || CSS || — || align=right | 14 km || 
|-id=081 bgcolor=#d6d6d6
| 41081 ||  || — || November 3, 1999 || Socorro || LINEAR || EOS || align=right | 6.3 km || 
|-id=082 bgcolor=#E9E9E9
| 41082 ||  || — || November 3, 1999 || Socorro || LINEAR || — || align=right | 5.2 km || 
|-id=083 bgcolor=#d6d6d6
| 41083 ||  || — || November 3, 1999 || Socorro || LINEAR || KOR || align=right | 7.0 km || 
|-id=084 bgcolor=#d6d6d6
| 41084 ||  || — || November 3, 1999 || Socorro || LINEAR || — || align=right | 8.1 km || 
|-id=085 bgcolor=#d6d6d6
| 41085 ||  || — || November 4, 1999 || Socorro || LINEAR || KOR || align=right | 3.3 km || 
|-id=086 bgcolor=#d6d6d6
| 41086 ||  || — || November 4, 1999 || Socorro || LINEAR || — || align=right | 3.1 km || 
|-id=087 bgcolor=#d6d6d6
| 41087 ||  || — || November 4, 1999 || Socorro || LINEAR || — || align=right | 3.4 km || 
|-id=088 bgcolor=#d6d6d6
| 41088 ||  || — || November 4, 1999 || Socorro || LINEAR || KOR || align=right | 3.0 km || 
|-id=089 bgcolor=#d6d6d6
| 41089 ||  || — || November 4, 1999 || Socorro || LINEAR || KOR || align=right | 3.5 km || 
|-id=090 bgcolor=#d6d6d6
| 41090 ||  || — || November 4, 1999 || Socorro || LINEAR || KOR || align=right | 4.2 km || 
|-id=091 bgcolor=#d6d6d6
| 41091 ||  || — || November 4, 1999 || Socorro || LINEAR || — || align=right | 5.2 km || 
|-id=092 bgcolor=#d6d6d6
| 41092 ||  || — || November 4, 1999 || Socorro || LINEAR || HYG || align=right | 7.6 km || 
|-id=093 bgcolor=#d6d6d6
| 41093 ||  || — || November 4, 1999 || Socorro || LINEAR || KOR || align=right | 3.6 km || 
|-id=094 bgcolor=#d6d6d6
| 41094 ||  || — || November 4, 1999 || Socorro || LINEAR || KOR || align=right | 3.5 km || 
|-id=095 bgcolor=#d6d6d6
| 41095 ||  || — || November 4, 1999 || Socorro || LINEAR || EOS || align=right | 5.4 km || 
|-id=096 bgcolor=#E9E9E9
| 41096 ||  || — || November 4, 1999 || Socorro || LINEAR || — || align=right | 5.3 km || 
|-id=097 bgcolor=#d6d6d6
| 41097 ||  || — || November 4, 1999 || Socorro || LINEAR || EOS || align=right | 4.5 km || 
|-id=098 bgcolor=#d6d6d6
| 41098 ||  || — || November 4, 1999 || Socorro || LINEAR || — || align=right | 5.1 km || 
|-id=099 bgcolor=#E9E9E9
| 41099 ||  || — || November 4, 1999 || Socorro || LINEAR || AST || align=right | 4.8 km || 
|-id=100 bgcolor=#E9E9E9
| 41100 ||  || — || November 4, 1999 || Socorro || LINEAR || — || align=right | 6.0 km || 
|}

41101–41200 

|-bgcolor=#d6d6d6
| 41101 ||  || — || November 4, 1999 || Socorro || LINEAR || 628 || align=right | 4.8 km || 
|-id=102 bgcolor=#d6d6d6
| 41102 ||  || — || November 4, 1999 || Socorro || LINEAR || — || align=right | 6.5 km || 
|-id=103 bgcolor=#d6d6d6
| 41103 ||  || — || November 4, 1999 || Socorro || LINEAR || — || align=right | 11 km || 
|-id=104 bgcolor=#d6d6d6
| 41104 ||  || — || November 4, 1999 || Socorro || LINEAR || KOR || align=right | 3.7 km || 
|-id=105 bgcolor=#d6d6d6
| 41105 ||  || — || November 4, 1999 || Socorro || LINEAR || — || align=right | 9.6 km || 
|-id=106 bgcolor=#d6d6d6
| 41106 ||  || — || November 4, 1999 || Socorro || LINEAR || THM || align=right | 9.0 km || 
|-id=107 bgcolor=#fefefe
| 41107 Ropakov ||  ||  || November 1, 1999 || Uccle || E. W. Elst, S. I. Ipatov || — || align=right | 2.2 km || 
|-id=108 bgcolor=#E9E9E9
| 41108 ||  || — || November 1, 1999 || Kitt Peak || Spacewatch || GEF || align=right | 2.9 km || 
|-id=109 bgcolor=#d6d6d6
| 41109 ||  || — || November 5, 1999 || Kitt Peak || Spacewatch || — || align=right | 7.3 km || 
|-id=110 bgcolor=#E9E9E9
| 41110 ||  || — || November 4, 1999 || Socorro || LINEAR || MAR || align=right | 3.2 km || 
|-id=111 bgcolor=#E9E9E9
| 41111 ||  || — || November 4, 1999 || Socorro || LINEAR || EUN || align=right | 3.9 km || 
|-id=112 bgcolor=#d6d6d6
| 41112 ||  || — || November 5, 1999 || Socorro || LINEAR || EOS || align=right | 6.3 km || 
|-id=113 bgcolor=#d6d6d6
| 41113 ||  || — || November 2, 1999 || Kitt Peak || Spacewatch || — || align=right | 4.6 km || 
|-id=114 bgcolor=#E9E9E9
| 41114 ||  || — || November 3, 1999 || Kitt Peak || Spacewatch || — || align=right | 7.4 km || 
|-id=115 bgcolor=#E9E9E9
| 41115 ||  || — || November 5, 1999 || Catalina || CSS || MAR || align=right | 4.4 km || 
|-id=116 bgcolor=#E9E9E9
| 41116 ||  || — || November 4, 1999 || Socorro || LINEAR || AGN || align=right | 3.8 km || 
|-id=117 bgcolor=#E9E9E9
| 41117 ||  || — || November 4, 1999 || Socorro || LINEAR || WIT || align=right | 3.6 km || 
|-id=118 bgcolor=#d6d6d6
| 41118 ||  || — || November 5, 1999 || Socorro || LINEAR || — || align=right | 9.5 km || 
|-id=119 bgcolor=#E9E9E9
| 41119 ||  || — || November 7, 1999 || Socorro || LINEAR || — || align=right | 4.6 km || 
|-id=120 bgcolor=#d6d6d6
| 41120 ||  || — || November 7, 1999 || Socorro || LINEAR || — || align=right | 6.8 km || 
|-id=121 bgcolor=#d6d6d6
| 41121 ||  || — || November 5, 1999 || Socorro || LINEAR || THM || align=right | 6.0 km || 
|-id=122 bgcolor=#d6d6d6
| 41122 ||  || — || November 5, 1999 || Socorro || LINEAR || — || align=right | 9.4 km || 
|-id=123 bgcolor=#E9E9E9
| 41123 ||  || — || November 5, 1999 || Socorro || LINEAR || — || align=right | 5.8 km || 
|-id=124 bgcolor=#E9E9E9
| 41124 ||  || — || November 5, 1999 || Socorro || LINEAR || — || align=right | 4.4 km || 
|-id=125 bgcolor=#d6d6d6
| 41125 ||  || — || November 9, 1999 || Socorro || LINEAR || EOS || align=right | 4.9 km || 
|-id=126 bgcolor=#d6d6d6
| 41126 ||  || — || November 9, 1999 || Socorro || LINEAR || THM || align=right | 5.4 km || 
|-id=127 bgcolor=#E9E9E9
| 41127 ||  || — || November 9, 1999 || Socorro || LINEAR || — || align=right | 4.6 km || 
|-id=128 bgcolor=#d6d6d6
| 41128 ||  || — || November 9, 1999 || Socorro || LINEAR || — || align=right | 6.5 km || 
|-id=129 bgcolor=#d6d6d6
| 41129 ||  || — || November 9, 1999 || Socorro || LINEAR || KOR || align=right | 3.1 km || 
|-id=130 bgcolor=#E9E9E9
| 41130 ||  || — || November 9, 1999 || Socorro || LINEAR || — || align=right | 2.5 km || 
|-id=131 bgcolor=#E9E9E9
| 41131 ||  || — || November 9, 1999 || Socorro || LINEAR || — || align=right | 3.6 km || 
|-id=132 bgcolor=#E9E9E9
| 41132 ||  || — || November 9, 1999 || Socorro || LINEAR || — || align=right | 4.6 km || 
|-id=133 bgcolor=#fefefe
| 41133 ||  || — || November 9, 1999 || Socorro || LINEAR || — || align=right | 1.8 km || 
|-id=134 bgcolor=#d6d6d6
| 41134 ||  || — || November 9, 1999 || Socorro || LINEAR || — || align=right | 5.5 km || 
|-id=135 bgcolor=#d6d6d6
| 41135 ||  || — || November 9, 1999 || Socorro || LINEAR || — || align=right | 5.0 km || 
|-id=136 bgcolor=#d6d6d6
| 41136 ||  || — || November 9, 1999 || Socorro || LINEAR || — || align=right | 6.0 km || 
|-id=137 bgcolor=#d6d6d6
| 41137 ||  || — || November 9, 1999 || Catalina || CSS || TEL || align=right | 3.9 km || 
|-id=138 bgcolor=#d6d6d6
| 41138 ||  || — || November 9, 1999 || Catalina || CSS || EOS || align=right | 5.9 km || 
|-id=139 bgcolor=#fefefe
| 41139 ||  || — || November 3, 1999 || Kitt Peak || Spacewatch || NYS || align=right | 1.7 km || 
|-id=140 bgcolor=#d6d6d6
| 41140 ||  || — || November 5, 1999 || Kitt Peak || Spacewatch || HYG || align=right | 6.4 km || 
|-id=141 bgcolor=#fefefe
| 41141 ||  || — || November 10, 1999 || Socorro || LINEAR || — || align=right | 2.1 km || 
|-id=142 bgcolor=#d6d6d6
| 41142 ||  || — || November 6, 1999 || Kitt Peak || Spacewatch || — || align=right | 4.7 km || 
|-id=143 bgcolor=#d6d6d6
| 41143 ||  || — || November 11, 1999 || Kitt Peak || Spacewatch || NAE || align=right | 5.3 km || 
|-id=144 bgcolor=#d6d6d6
| 41144 ||  || — || November 9, 1999 || Kitt Peak || Spacewatch || EOS || align=right | 5.2 km || 
|-id=145 bgcolor=#d6d6d6
| 41145 ||  || — || November 9, 1999 || Socorro || LINEAR || KOR || align=right | 3.1 km || 
|-id=146 bgcolor=#E9E9E9
| 41146 ||  || — || November 12, 1999 || Socorro || LINEAR || — || align=right | 2.8 km || 
|-id=147 bgcolor=#d6d6d6
| 41147 ||  || — || November 12, 1999 || Socorro || LINEAR || THM || align=right | 5.9 km || 
|-id=148 bgcolor=#E9E9E9
| 41148 ||  || — || November 11, 1999 || Catalina || CSS || — || align=right | 5.8 km || 
|-id=149 bgcolor=#d6d6d6
| 41149 ||  || — || November 11, 1999 || Catalina || CSS || HYG || align=right | 7.9 km || 
|-id=150 bgcolor=#E9E9E9
| 41150 ||  || — || November 12, 1999 || Socorro || LINEAR || AST || align=right | 4.3 km || 
|-id=151 bgcolor=#E9E9E9
| 41151 ||  || — || November 14, 1999 || Socorro || LINEAR || EUN || align=right | 3.2 km || 
|-id=152 bgcolor=#d6d6d6
| 41152 ||  || — || November 14, 1999 || Socorro || LINEAR || THM || align=right | 6.3 km || 
|-id=153 bgcolor=#d6d6d6
| 41153 ||  || — || November 14, 1999 || Socorro || LINEAR || — || align=right | 6.8 km || 
|-id=154 bgcolor=#d6d6d6
| 41154 ||  || — || November 14, 1999 || Socorro || LINEAR || HYG || align=right | 8.4 km || 
|-id=155 bgcolor=#E9E9E9
| 41155 ||  || — || November 14, 1999 || Socorro || LINEAR || — || align=right | 2.7 km || 
|-id=156 bgcolor=#E9E9E9
| 41156 ||  || — || November 14, 1999 || Socorro || LINEAR || KON || align=right | 6.9 km || 
|-id=157 bgcolor=#E9E9E9
| 41157 ||  || — || November 14, 1999 || Socorro || LINEAR || — || align=right | 7.1 km || 
|-id=158 bgcolor=#E9E9E9
| 41158 ||  || — || November 14, 1999 || Socorro || LINEAR || — || align=right | 6.6 km || 
|-id=159 bgcolor=#d6d6d6
| 41159 ||  || — || November 14, 1999 || Socorro || LINEAR || KOR || align=right | 2.9 km || 
|-id=160 bgcolor=#d6d6d6
| 41160 ||  || — || November 14, 1999 || Socorro || LINEAR || KOR || align=right | 3.4 km || 
|-id=161 bgcolor=#d6d6d6
| 41161 ||  || — || November 14, 1999 || Socorro || LINEAR || EOS || align=right | 4.1 km || 
|-id=162 bgcolor=#d6d6d6
| 41162 ||  || — || November 14, 1999 || Socorro || LINEAR || — || align=right | 7.7 km || 
|-id=163 bgcolor=#E9E9E9
| 41163 ||  || — || November 14, 1999 || Socorro || LINEAR || — || align=right | 6.3 km || 
|-id=164 bgcolor=#d6d6d6
| 41164 ||  || — || November 14, 1999 || Socorro || LINEAR || MRC || align=right | 5.0 km || 
|-id=165 bgcolor=#d6d6d6
| 41165 ||  || — || November 14, 1999 || Socorro || LINEAR || EOS || align=right | 7.0 km || 
|-id=166 bgcolor=#d6d6d6
| 41166 ||  || — || November 14, 1999 || Socorro || LINEAR || HYG || align=right | 8.5 km || 
|-id=167 bgcolor=#d6d6d6
| 41167 ||  || — || November 14, 1999 || Socorro || LINEAR || EOS || align=right | 5.2 km || 
|-id=168 bgcolor=#d6d6d6
| 41168 ||  || — || November 3, 1999 || Anderson Mesa || LONEOS || — || align=right | 5.7 km || 
|-id=169 bgcolor=#d6d6d6
| 41169 ||  || — || November 12, 1999 || Anderson Mesa || LONEOS || — || align=right | 5.3 km || 
|-id=170 bgcolor=#d6d6d6
| 41170 ||  || — || November 1, 1999 || Catalina || CSS || — || align=right | 8.7 km || 
|-id=171 bgcolor=#E9E9E9
| 41171 ||  || — || November 4, 1999 || Socorro || LINEAR || EUN || align=right | 3.8 km || 
|-id=172 bgcolor=#d6d6d6
| 41172 ||  || — || November 5, 1999 || Socorro || LINEAR || KOR || align=right | 2.9 km || 
|-id=173 bgcolor=#d6d6d6
| 41173 ||  || — || November 6, 1999 || Socorro || LINEAR || — || align=right | 6.2 km || 
|-id=174 bgcolor=#d6d6d6
| 41174 ||  || — || November 15, 1999 || Socorro || LINEAR || MEL || align=right | 10 km || 
|-id=175 bgcolor=#d6d6d6
| 41175 ||  || — || November 15, 1999 || Socorro || LINEAR || — || align=right | 4.7 km || 
|-id=176 bgcolor=#E9E9E9
| 41176 ||  || — || November 15, 1999 || Socorro || LINEAR || EUN || align=right | 3.2 km || 
|-id=177 bgcolor=#d6d6d6
| 41177 ||  || — || November 15, 1999 || Socorro || LINEAR || VER || align=right | 7.7 km || 
|-id=178 bgcolor=#d6d6d6
| 41178 ||  || — || November 15, 1999 || Socorro || LINEAR || — || align=right | 5.8 km || 
|-id=179 bgcolor=#E9E9E9
| 41179 ||  || — || November 1, 1999 || Anderson Mesa || LONEOS || — || align=right | 4.2 km || 
|-id=180 bgcolor=#E9E9E9
| 41180 ||  || — || November 2, 1999 || Kitt Peak || Spacewatch || — || align=right | 2.3 km || 
|-id=181 bgcolor=#E9E9E9
| 41181 ||  || — || November 1, 1999 || Catalina || CSS || JUN || align=right | 2.2 km || 
|-id=182 bgcolor=#d6d6d6
| 41182 ||  || — || November 3, 1999 || Catalina || CSS || HYG || align=right | 7.7 km || 
|-id=183 bgcolor=#d6d6d6
| 41183 ||  || — || November 3, 1999 || Catalina || CSS || KOR || align=right | 3.9 km || 
|-id=184 bgcolor=#E9E9E9
| 41184 Devogèle ||  ||  || November 4, 1999 || Anderson Mesa || LONEOS || WAT || align=right | 5.3 km || 
|-id=185 bgcolor=#d6d6d6
| 41185 ||  || — || November 5, 1999 || Catalina || CSS || TIR || align=right | 7.4 km || 
|-id=186 bgcolor=#E9E9E9
| 41186 ||  || — || November 5, 1999 || Catalina || CSS || — || align=right | 2.6 km || 
|-id=187 bgcolor=#fefefe
| 41187 ||  || — || November 6, 1999 || Catalina || CSS || — || align=right | 2.3 km || 
|-id=188 bgcolor=#d6d6d6
| 41188 ||  || — || November 6, 1999 || Catalina || CSS || — || align=right | 12 km || 
|-id=189 bgcolor=#d6d6d6
| 41189 ||  || — || November 6, 1999 || Catalina || CSS || ALA || align=right | 12 km || 
|-id=190 bgcolor=#E9E9E9
| 41190 ||  || — || November 8, 1999 || Anderson Mesa || LONEOS || — || align=right | 2.7 km || 
|-id=191 bgcolor=#d6d6d6
| 41191 ||  || — || November 8, 1999 || Catalina || CSS || ALA || align=right | 9.1 km || 
|-id=192 bgcolor=#d6d6d6
| 41192 ||  || — || November 12, 1999 || Socorro || LINEAR || HYG || align=right | 6.1 km || 
|-id=193 bgcolor=#E9E9E9
| 41193 ||  || — || November 10, 1999 || Anderson Mesa || LONEOS || GER || align=right | 4.0 km || 
|-id=194 bgcolor=#d6d6d6
| 41194 ||  || — || November 12, 1999 || Anderson Mesa || LONEOS || — || align=right | 7.1 km || 
|-id=195 bgcolor=#d6d6d6
| 41195 ||  || — || November 4, 1999 || Socorro || LINEAR || — || align=right | 6.2 km || 
|-id=196 bgcolor=#d6d6d6
| 41196 ||  || — || November 5, 1999 || Socorro || LINEAR || — || align=right | 6.8 km || 
|-id=197 bgcolor=#d6d6d6
| 41197 ||  || — || November 3, 1999 || Catalina || CSS || — || align=right | 6.4 km || 
|-id=198 bgcolor=#E9E9E9
| 41198 || 1999 WB || — || November 16, 1999 || Fountain Hills || C. W. Juels || MAR || align=right | 4.4 km || 
|-id=199 bgcolor=#E9E9E9
| 41199 Wakanaootaki ||  ||  || November 21, 1999 || Goodricke-Pigott || R. A. Tucker || — || align=right | 6.0 km || 
|-id=200 bgcolor=#d6d6d6
| 41200 ||  || — || November 27, 1999 || Višnjan Observatory || K. Korlević || — || align=right | 10 km || 
|}

41201–41300 

|-bgcolor=#d6d6d6
| 41201 ||  || — || November 28, 1999 || Oizumi || T. Kobayashi || — || align=right | 7.4 km || 
|-id=202 bgcolor=#d6d6d6
| 41202 ||  || — || November 28, 1999 || Višnjan Observatory || K. Korlević || EOS || align=right | 5.1 km || 
|-id=203 bgcolor=#d6d6d6
| 41203 ||  || — || November 28, 1999 || Višnjan Observatory || K. Korlević || LIX || align=right | 13 km || 
|-id=204 bgcolor=#d6d6d6
| 41204 ||  || — || November 28, 1999 || Gnosca || S. Sposetti || URS || align=right | 14 km || 
|-id=205 bgcolor=#E9E9E9
| 41205 ||  || — || November 28, 1999 || Gnosca || S. Sposetti || — || align=right | 3.1 km || 
|-id=206 bgcolor=#E9E9E9
| 41206 Sciannameo ||  ||  || November 27, 1999 || Osservatorio Polino || Polino Obs. || EUN || align=right | 3.9 km || 
|-id=207 bgcolor=#E9E9E9
| 41207 ||  || — || November 29, 1999 || Bédoin || P. Antonini || — || align=right | 2.3 km || 
|-id=208 bgcolor=#E9E9E9
| 41208 ||  || — || November 29, 1999 || Farra d'Isonzo || Farra d'Isonzo || — || align=right | 2.6 km || 
|-id=209 bgcolor=#E9E9E9
| 41209 ||  || — || November 29, 1999 || Kitt Peak || Spacewatch || WIT || align=right | 3.3 km || 
|-id=210 bgcolor=#fefefe
| 41210 ||  || — || November 27, 1999 || Anderson Mesa || LONEOS || — || align=right | 3.0 km || 
|-id=211 bgcolor=#d6d6d6
| 41211 ||  || — || December 2, 1999 || Oizumi || T. Kobayashi || 7:4 || align=right | 8.7 km || 
|-id=212 bgcolor=#E9E9E9
| 41212 ||  || — || December 2, 1999 || Socorro || LINEAR || — || align=right | 2.8 km || 
|-id=213 bgcolor=#E9E9E9
| 41213 Mimoun ||  ||  || December 2, 1999 || Les Tardieux Obs. || M. Boeuf || — || align=right | 4.7 km || 
|-id=214 bgcolor=#E9E9E9
| 41214 ||  || — || December 4, 1999 || Catalina || CSS || GEF || align=right | 3.8 km || 
|-id=215 bgcolor=#d6d6d6
| 41215 ||  || — || December 4, 1999 || Catalina || CSS || — || align=right | 6.2 km || 
|-id=216 bgcolor=#d6d6d6
| 41216 ||  || — || December 4, 1999 || Catalina || CSS || — || align=right | 6.4 km || 
|-id=217 bgcolor=#E9E9E9
| 41217 ||  || — || December 4, 1999 || Catalina || CSS || — || align=right | 3.9 km || 
|-id=218 bgcolor=#d6d6d6
| 41218 ||  || — || December 5, 1999 || Catalina || CSS || — || align=right | 12 km || 
|-id=219 bgcolor=#E9E9E9
| 41219 ||  || — || December 6, 1999 || Catalina || CSS || — || align=right | 7.0 km || 
|-id=220 bgcolor=#E9E9E9
| 41220 ||  || — || December 5, 1999 || Socorro || LINEAR || GEF || align=right | 3.4 km || 
|-id=221 bgcolor=#E9E9E9
| 41221 ||  || — || December 5, 1999 || Socorro || LINEAR || — || align=right | 8.3 km || 
|-id=222 bgcolor=#d6d6d6
| 41222 ||  || — || December 2, 1999 || Ondřejov || L. Kotková || — || align=right | 5.7 km || 
|-id=223 bgcolor=#FA8072
| 41223 ||  || — || December 7, 1999 || Catalina || CSS || — || align=right | 7.4 km || 
|-id=224 bgcolor=#d6d6d6
| 41224 ||  || — || December 3, 1999 || Socorro || LINEAR || — || align=right | 3.9 km || 
|-id=225 bgcolor=#E9E9E9
| 41225 ||  || — || December 3, 1999 || Socorro || LINEAR || MRX || align=right | 2.6 km || 
|-id=226 bgcolor=#E9E9E9
| 41226 ||  || — || December 3, 1999 || Socorro || LINEAR || — || align=right | 5.1 km || 
|-id=227 bgcolor=#d6d6d6
| 41227 ||  || — || December 3, 1999 || Socorro || LINEAR || KOR || align=right | 4.3 km || 
|-id=228 bgcolor=#E9E9E9
| 41228 ||  || — || December 3, 1999 || Socorro || LINEAR || — || align=right | 2.6 km || 
|-id=229 bgcolor=#E9E9E9
| 41229 ||  || — || December 3, 1999 || Socorro || LINEAR || ADE || align=right | 6.3 km || 
|-id=230 bgcolor=#d6d6d6
| 41230 ||  || — || December 5, 1999 || Socorro || LINEAR || KOR || align=right | 3.4 km || 
|-id=231 bgcolor=#E9E9E9
| 41231 ||  || — || December 5, 1999 || Socorro || LINEAR || — || align=right | 4.7 km || 
|-id=232 bgcolor=#E9E9E9
| 41232 ||  || — || December 5, 1999 || Socorro || LINEAR || — || align=right | 4.2 km || 
|-id=233 bgcolor=#E9E9E9
| 41233 ||  || — || December 6, 1999 || Socorro || LINEAR || EUN || align=right | 5.3 km || 
|-id=234 bgcolor=#d6d6d6
| 41234 ||  || — || December 6, 1999 || Socorro || LINEAR || — || align=right | 7.3 km || 
|-id=235 bgcolor=#d6d6d6
| 41235 ||  || — || December 6, 1999 || Socorro || LINEAR || URS || align=right | 9.2 km || 
|-id=236 bgcolor=#E9E9E9
| 41236 ||  || — || December 6, 1999 || Socorro || LINEAR || — || align=right | 4.3 km || 
|-id=237 bgcolor=#d6d6d6
| 41237 ||  || — || December 6, 1999 || Socorro || LINEAR || THM || align=right | 6.3 km || 
|-id=238 bgcolor=#E9E9E9
| 41238 ||  || — || December 6, 1999 || Socorro || LINEAR || MIS || align=right | 5.9 km || 
|-id=239 bgcolor=#d6d6d6
| 41239 ||  || — || December 6, 1999 || Socorro || LINEAR || — || align=right | 9.9 km || 
|-id=240 bgcolor=#d6d6d6
| 41240 ||  || — || December 6, 1999 || Socorro || LINEAR || — || align=right | 7.8 km || 
|-id=241 bgcolor=#E9E9E9
| 41241 ||  || — || December 6, 1999 || Socorro || LINEAR || — || align=right | 2.7 km || 
|-id=242 bgcolor=#d6d6d6
| 41242 ||  || — || December 6, 1999 || Socorro || LINEAR || KOR || align=right | 3.5 km || 
|-id=243 bgcolor=#d6d6d6
| 41243 ||  || — || December 6, 1999 || Socorro || LINEAR || EOS || align=right | 4.2 km || 
|-id=244 bgcolor=#E9E9E9
| 41244 ||  || — || December 6, 1999 || Socorro || LINEAR || — || align=right | 5.0 km || 
|-id=245 bgcolor=#E9E9E9
| 41245 ||  || — || December 7, 1999 || Fountain Hills || C. W. Juels || — || align=right | 5.1 km || 
|-id=246 bgcolor=#E9E9E9
| 41246 ||  || — || December 5, 1999 || Socorro || LINEAR || — || align=right | 5.9 km || 
|-id=247 bgcolor=#E9E9E9
| 41247 ||  || — || December 6, 1999 || Socorro || LINEAR || — || align=right | 8.1 km || 
|-id=248 bgcolor=#d6d6d6
| 41248 ||  || — || December 7, 1999 || Socorro || LINEAR || — || align=right | 4.8 km || 
|-id=249 bgcolor=#E9E9E9
| 41249 ||  || — || December 7, 1999 || Socorro || LINEAR || — || align=right | 3.9 km || 
|-id=250 bgcolor=#d6d6d6
| 41250 ||  || — || December 7, 1999 || Socorro || LINEAR || — || align=right | 6.4 km || 
|-id=251 bgcolor=#d6d6d6
| 41251 ||  || — || December 7, 1999 || Socorro || LINEAR || — || align=right | 7.0 km || 
|-id=252 bgcolor=#d6d6d6
| 41252 ||  || — || December 7, 1999 || Socorro || LINEAR || EOS || align=right | 5.0 km || 
|-id=253 bgcolor=#E9E9E9
| 41253 ||  || — || December 7, 1999 || Socorro || LINEAR || — || align=right | 3.9 km || 
|-id=254 bgcolor=#d6d6d6
| 41254 ||  || — || December 7, 1999 || Socorro || LINEAR || EOS || align=right | 4.1 km || 
|-id=255 bgcolor=#E9E9E9
| 41255 ||  || — || December 7, 1999 || Socorro || LINEAR || — || align=right | 2.7 km || 
|-id=256 bgcolor=#E9E9E9
| 41256 ||  || — || December 7, 1999 || Socorro || LINEAR || EUN || align=right | 3.7 km || 
|-id=257 bgcolor=#d6d6d6
| 41257 ||  || — || December 7, 1999 || Socorro || LINEAR || — || align=right | 5.4 km || 
|-id=258 bgcolor=#d6d6d6
| 41258 ||  || — || December 7, 1999 || Socorro || LINEAR || — || align=right | 6.8 km || 
|-id=259 bgcolor=#d6d6d6
| 41259 ||  || — || December 7, 1999 || Socorro || LINEAR || — || align=right | 6.5 km || 
|-id=260 bgcolor=#d6d6d6
| 41260 ||  || — || December 7, 1999 || Socorro || LINEAR || — || align=right | 7.5 km || 
|-id=261 bgcolor=#d6d6d6
| 41261 ||  || — || December 7, 1999 || Socorro || LINEAR || KOR || align=right | 4.1 km || 
|-id=262 bgcolor=#d6d6d6
| 41262 ||  || — || December 7, 1999 || Socorro || LINEAR || 2:1J || align=right | 6.9 km || 
|-id=263 bgcolor=#d6d6d6
| 41263 ||  || — || December 7, 1999 || Socorro || LINEAR || EOS || align=right | 4.1 km || 
|-id=264 bgcolor=#d6d6d6
| 41264 ||  || — || December 7, 1999 || Socorro || LINEAR || — || align=right | 9.5 km || 
|-id=265 bgcolor=#E9E9E9
| 41265 ||  || — || December 7, 1999 || Socorro || LINEAR || — || align=right | 4.3 km || 
|-id=266 bgcolor=#d6d6d6
| 41266 ||  || — || December 7, 1999 || Socorro || LINEAR || — || align=right | 6.8 km || 
|-id=267 bgcolor=#d6d6d6
| 41267 ||  || — || December 7, 1999 || Socorro || LINEAR || — || align=right | 7.4 km || 
|-id=268 bgcolor=#C2FFFF
| 41268 ||  || — || December 7, 1999 || Socorro || LINEAR || L4 || align=right | 15 km || 
|-id=269 bgcolor=#d6d6d6
| 41269 ||  || — || December 7, 1999 || Socorro || LINEAR || — || align=right | 10 km || 
|-id=270 bgcolor=#E9E9E9
| 41270 ||  || — || December 7, 1999 || Socorro || LINEAR || — || align=right | 8.6 km || 
|-id=271 bgcolor=#E9E9E9
| 41271 ||  || — || December 7, 1999 || Socorro || LINEAR || — || align=right | 3.6 km || 
|-id=272 bgcolor=#d6d6d6
| 41272 ||  || — || December 7, 1999 || Socorro || LINEAR || EOS || align=right | 7.2 km || 
|-id=273 bgcolor=#d6d6d6
| 41273 ||  || — || December 7, 1999 || Socorro || LINEAR || EOS || align=right | 4.9 km || 
|-id=274 bgcolor=#d6d6d6
| 41274 ||  || — || December 7, 1999 || Socorro || LINEAR || EOS || align=right | 7.3 km || 
|-id=275 bgcolor=#d6d6d6
| 41275 ||  || — || December 7, 1999 || Socorro || LINEAR || — || align=right | 6.4 km || 
|-id=276 bgcolor=#d6d6d6
| 41276 ||  || — || December 7, 1999 || Socorro || LINEAR || — || align=right | 8.4 km || 
|-id=277 bgcolor=#d6d6d6
| 41277 ||  || — || December 7, 1999 || Socorro || LINEAR || — || align=right | 6.5 km || 
|-id=278 bgcolor=#d6d6d6
| 41278 ||  || — || December 7, 1999 || Socorro || LINEAR || HIL3:2 || align=right | 16 km || 
|-id=279 bgcolor=#d6d6d6
| 41279 Trentman ||  ||  || December 8, 1999 || Olathe || L. Robinson || — || align=right | 8.7 km || 
|-id=280 bgcolor=#E9E9E9
| 41280 ||  || — || December 7, 1999 || Oizumi || T. Kobayashi || — || align=right | 4.0 km || 
|-id=281 bgcolor=#d6d6d6
| 41281 ||  || — || December 9, 1999 || Oizumi || T. Kobayashi || — || align=right | 10 km || 
|-id=282 bgcolor=#d6d6d6
| 41282 ||  || — || December 7, 1999 || Socorro || LINEAR || — || align=right | 7.7 km || 
|-id=283 bgcolor=#d6d6d6
| 41283 ||  || — || December 7, 1999 || Socorro || LINEAR || 3:2 || align=right | 18 km || 
|-id=284 bgcolor=#d6d6d6
| 41284 ||  || — || December 7, 1999 || Socorro || LINEAR || EOS || align=right | 7.2 km || 
|-id=285 bgcolor=#E9E9E9
| 41285 ||  || — || December 4, 1999 || Catalina || CSS || — || align=right | 4.7 km || 
|-id=286 bgcolor=#d6d6d6
| 41286 ||  || — || December 4, 1999 || Catalina || CSS || — || align=right | 12 km || 
|-id=287 bgcolor=#E9E9E9
| 41287 ||  || — || December 4, 1999 || Catalina || CSS || — || align=right | 3.1 km || 
|-id=288 bgcolor=#E9E9E9
| 41288 ||  || — || December 4, 1999 || Catalina || CSS || — || align=right | 3.7 km || 
|-id=289 bgcolor=#d6d6d6
| 41289 ||  || — || December 4, 1999 || Catalina || CSS || — || align=right | 7.1 km || 
|-id=290 bgcolor=#d6d6d6
| 41290 ||  || — || December 4, 1999 || Catalina || CSS || URS || align=right | 8.1 km || 
|-id=291 bgcolor=#d6d6d6
| 41291 ||  || — || December 4, 1999 || Catalina || CSS || KOR || align=right | 3.9 km || 
|-id=292 bgcolor=#d6d6d6
| 41292 ||  || — || December 4, 1999 || Catalina || CSS || — || align=right | 8.0 km || 
|-id=293 bgcolor=#d6d6d6
| 41293 ||  || — || December 4, 1999 || Catalina || CSS || KOR || align=right | 3.7 km || 
|-id=294 bgcolor=#d6d6d6
| 41294 ||  || — || December 4, 1999 || Catalina || CSS || — || align=right | 8.6 km || 
|-id=295 bgcolor=#d6d6d6
| 41295 ||  || — || December 4, 1999 || Catalina || CSS || TEL || align=right | 4.1 km || 
|-id=296 bgcolor=#d6d6d6
| 41296 ||  || — || December 5, 1999 || Catalina || CSS || ALA || align=right | 10 km || 
|-id=297 bgcolor=#E9E9E9
| 41297 ||  || — || December 7, 1999 || Catalina || CSS || EUN || align=right | 3.7 km || 
|-id=298 bgcolor=#d6d6d6
| 41298 ||  || — || December 7, 1999 || Catalina || CSS || — || align=right | 13 km || 
|-id=299 bgcolor=#E9E9E9
| 41299 ||  || — || December 7, 1999 || Catalina || CSS || — || align=right | 3.7 km || 
|-id=300 bgcolor=#d6d6d6
| 41300 ||  || — || December 7, 1999 || Catalina || CSS || EOS || align=right | 4.9 km || 
|}

41301–41400 

|-bgcolor=#d6d6d6
| 41301 ||  || — || December 6, 1999 || Gnosca || S. Sposetti || — || align=right | 8.3 km || 
|-id=302 bgcolor=#d6d6d6
| 41302 ||  || — || December 12, 1999 || Socorro || LINEAR || VER || align=right | 9.5 km || 
|-id=303 bgcolor=#d6d6d6
| 41303 ||  || — || December 2, 1999 || Kitt Peak || Spacewatch || — || align=right | 4.8 km || 
|-id=304 bgcolor=#E9E9E9
| 41304 ||  || — || December 2, 1999 || Kitt Peak || Spacewatch || — || align=right | 8.7 km || 
|-id=305 bgcolor=#d6d6d6
| 41305 ||  || — || December 15, 1999 || Fountain Hills || C. W. Juels || FIR || align=right | 13 km || 
|-id=306 bgcolor=#d6d6d6
| 41306 ||  || — || December 7, 1999 || Kitt Peak || Spacewatch || — || align=right | 5.2 km || 
|-id=307 bgcolor=#d6d6d6
| 41307 ||  || — || December 8, 1999 || Kitt Peak || Spacewatch || KAR || align=right | 2.5 km || 
|-id=308 bgcolor=#d6d6d6
| 41308 ||  || — || December 8, 1999 || Socorro || LINEAR || — || align=right | 9.9 km || 
|-id=309 bgcolor=#d6d6d6
| 41309 ||  || — || December 8, 1999 || Socorro || LINEAR || — || align=right | 9.6 km || 
|-id=310 bgcolor=#d6d6d6
| 41310 ||  || — || December 8, 1999 || Socorro || LINEAR || EOS || align=right | 8.8 km || 
|-id=311 bgcolor=#d6d6d6
| 41311 ||  || — || December 10, 1999 || Socorro || LINEAR || — || align=right | 12 km || 
|-id=312 bgcolor=#d6d6d6
| 41312 ||  || — || December 10, 1999 || Socorro || LINEAR || — || align=right | 9.1 km || 
|-id=313 bgcolor=#E9E9E9
| 41313 ||  || — || December 10, 1999 || Socorro || LINEAR || — || align=right | 4.7 km || 
|-id=314 bgcolor=#E9E9E9
| 41314 ||  || — || December 10, 1999 || Socorro || LINEAR || GEF || align=right | 5.4 km || 
|-id=315 bgcolor=#d6d6d6
| 41315 ||  || — || December 10, 1999 || Socorro || LINEAR || — || align=right | 10 km || 
|-id=316 bgcolor=#d6d6d6
| 41316 ||  || — || December 12, 1999 || Socorro || LINEAR || EOS || align=right | 9.1 km || 
|-id=317 bgcolor=#E9E9E9
| 41317 ||  || — || December 12, 1999 || Socorro || LINEAR || — || align=right | 4.9 km || 
|-id=318 bgcolor=#d6d6d6
| 41318 ||  || — || December 12, 1999 || Socorro || LINEAR || — || align=right | 6.6 km || 
|-id=319 bgcolor=#E9E9E9
| 41319 ||  || — || December 13, 1999 || Socorro || LINEAR || — || align=right | 4.8 km || 
|-id=320 bgcolor=#d6d6d6
| 41320 ||  || — || December 13, 1999 || Socorro || LINEAR || EOS || align=right | 7.0 km || 
|-id=321 bgcolor=#d6d6d6
| 41321 ||  || — || December 13, 1999 || Socorro || LINEAR || — || align=right | 8.7 km || 
|-id=322 bgcolor=#E9E9E9
| 41322 ||  || — || December 14, 1999 || Socorro || LINEAR || — || align=right | 3.9 km || 
|-id=323 bgcolor=#d6d6d6
| 41323 ||  || — || December 14, 1999 || Socorro || LINEAR || EOS || align=right | 7.0 km || 
|-id=324 bgcolor=#E9E9E9
| 41324 ||  || — || December 14, 1999 || Socorro || LINEAR || — || align=right | 3.3 km || 
|-id=325 bgcolor=#d6d6d6
| 41325 ||  || — || December 14, 1999 || Socorro || LINEAR || EOS || align=right | 5.7 km || 
|-id=326 bgcolor=#d6d6d6
| 41326 ||  || — || December 14, 1999 || Socorro || LINEAR || — || align=right | 13 km || 
|-id=327 bgcolor=#d6d6d6
| 41327 ||  || — || December 13, 1999 || Kitt Peak || Spacewatch || THM || align=right | 9.2 km || 
|-id=328 bgcolor=#E9E9E9
| 41328 ||  || — || December 14, 1999 || Socorro || LINEAR || — || align=right | 4.6 km || 
|-id=329 bgcolor=#d6d6d6
| 41329 ||  || — || December 15, 1999 || Socorro || LINEAR || 7:4 || align=right | 13 km || 
|-id=330 bgcolor=#fefefe
| 41330 ||  || — || December 13, 1999 || Kitt Peak || Spacewatch || — || align=right | 2.3 km || 
|-id=331 bgcolor=#fefefe
| 41331 ||  || — || December 9, 1999 || Socorro || LINEAR || PHO || align=right | 5.5 km || 
|-id=332 bgcolor=#d6d6d6
| 41332 ||  || — || December 3, 1999 || Socorro || LINEAR || — || align=right | 8.7 km || 
|-id=333 bgcolor=#E9E9E9
| 41333 ||  || — || December 3, 1999 || Socorro || LINEAR || — || align=right | 3.4 km || 
|-id=334 bgcolor=#d6d6d6
| 41334 ||  || — || December 13, 1999 || Catalina || CSS || EOS || align=right | 6.3 km || 
|-id=335 bgcolor=#fefefe
| 41335 ||  || — || December 3, 1999 || Socorro || LINEAR || — || align=right | 2.3 km || 
|-id=336 bgcolor=#d6d6d6
| 41336 ||  || — || December 4, 1999 || Kitt Peak || Spacewatch || — || align=right | 4.0 km || 
|-id=337 bgcolor=#d6d6d6
| 41337 ||  || — || December 5, 1999 || Anderson Mesa || LONEOS || — || align=right | 13 km || 
|-id=338 bgcolor=#E9E9E9
| 41338 ||  || — || December 25, 1999 || Prescott || P. G. Comba || — || align=right | 3.5 km || 
|-id=339 bgcolor=#E9E9E9
| 41339 ||  || — || December 31, 1999 || Oizumi || T. Kobayashi || MRX || align=right | 3.7 km || 
|-id=340 bgcolor=#C2FFFF
| 41340 ||  || — || December 31, 1999 || Socorro || LINEAR || L4 || align=right | 35 km || 
|-id=341 bgcolor=#d6d6d6
| 41341 ||  || — || December 30, 1999 || Anderson Mesa || LONEOS || — || align=right | 9.8 km || 
|-id=342 bgcolor=#C2FFFF
| 41342 ||  || — || December 30, 1999 || Anderson Mesa || LONEOS || L4 || align=right | 13 km || 
|-id=343 bgcolor=#d6d6d6
| 41343 ||  || — || January 3, 2000 || Socorro || LINEAR || — || align=right | 8.9 km || 
|-id=344 bgcolor=#d6d6d6
| 41344 ||  || — || January 3, 2000 || Socorro || LINEAR || 7:4 || align=right | 12 km || 
|-id=345 bgcolor=#d6d6d6
| 41345 ||  || — || January 3, 2000 || Socorro || LINEAR || — || align=right | 13 km || 
|-id=346 bgcolor=#d6d6d6
| 41346 ||  || — || January 3, 2000 || Socorro || LINEAR || — || align=right | 8.2 km || 
|-id=347 bgcolor=#d6d6d6
| 41347 ||  || — || January 3, 2000 || Socorro || LINEAR || — || align=right | 6.8 km || 
|-id=348 bgcolor=#E9E9E9
| 41348 ||  || — || January 3, 2000 || Socorro || LINEAR || — || align=right | 3.2 km || 
|-id=349 bgcolor=#d6d6d6
| 41349 ||  || — || January 3, 2000 || Socorro || LINEAR || — || align=right | 12 km || 
|-id=350 bgcolor=#C2FFFF
| 41350 ||  || — || January 3, 2000 || Socorro || LINEAR || L4 || align=right | 16 km || 
|-id=351 bgcolor=#d6d6d6
| 41351 ||  || — || January 3, 2000 || Socorro || LINEAR || 3:2 || align=right | 15 km || 
|-id=352 bgcolor=#d6d6d6
| 41352 ||  || — || January 3, 2000 || Socorro || LINEAR || — || align=right | 14 km || 
|-id=353 bgcolor=#C2FFFF
| 41353 ||  || — || January 3, 2000 || Socorro || LINEAR || L4 || align=right | 17 km || 
|-id=354 bgcolor=#d6d6d6
| 41354 ||  || — || January 3, 2000 || Socorro || LINEAR || — || align=right | 14 km || 
|-id=355 bgcolor=#C2FFFF
| 41355 ||  || — || January 3, 2000 || Socorro || LINEAR || L4 || align=right | 12 km || 
|-id=356 bgcolor=#d6d6d6
| 41356 ||  || — || January 4, 2000 || Socorro || LINEAR || HYG || align=right | 9.6 km || 
|-id=357 bgcolor=#E9E9E9
| 41357 ||  || — || January 4, 2000 || Socorro || LINEAR || — || align=right | 4.0 km || 
|-id=358 bgcolor=#d6d6d6
| 41358 ||  || — || January 4, 2000 || Socorro || LINEAR || SAN || align=right | 8.8 km || 
|-id=359 bgcolor=#C2FFFF
| 41359 ||  || — || January 4, 2000 || Socorro || LINEAR || L4 || align=right | 16 km || 
|-id=360 bgcolor=#d6d6d6
| 41360 ||  || — || January 5, 2000 || Socorro || LINEAR || — || align=right | 14 km || 
|-id=361 bgcolor=#d6d6d6
| 41361 ||  || — || January 5, 2000 || Socorro || LINEAR || — || align=right | 11 km || 
|-id=362 bgcolor=#d6d6d6
| 41362 ||  || — || January 5, 2000 || Socorro || LINEAR || EOS || align=right | 6.8 km || 
|-id=363 bgcolor=#d6d6d6
| 41363 ||  || — || January 5, 2000 || Socorro || LINEAR || SYL7:4 || align=right | 14 km || 
|-id=364 bgcolor=#fefefe
| 41364 ||  || — || January 4, 2000 || Socorro || LINEAR || — || align=right | 2.2 km || 
|-id=365 bgcolor=#d6d6d6
| 41365 ||  || — || January 5, 2000 || Socorro || LINEAR || HIL3:2 || align=right | 14 km || 
|-id=366 bgcolor=#E9E9E9
| 41366 ||  || — || January 5, 2000 || Socorro || LINEAR || — || align=right | 3.0 km || 
|-id=367 bgcolor=#d6d6d6
| 41367 ||  || — || January 5, 2000 || Socorro || LINEAR || — || align=right | 10 km || 
|-id=368 bgcolor=#E9E9E9
| 41368 ||  || — || January 5, 2000 || Socorro || LINEAR || — || align=right | 6.4 km || 
|-id=369 bgcolor=#d6d6d6
| 41369 ||  || — || January 5, 2000 || Socorro || LINEAR || — || align=right | 11 km || 
|-id=370 bgcolor=#d6d6d6
| 41370 ||  || — || January 5, 2000 || Socorro || LINEAR || EOS || align=right | 5.4 km || 
|-id=371 bgcolor=#d6d6d6
| 41371 ||  || — || January 5, 2000 || Socorro || LINEAR || — || align=right | 8.3 km || 
|-id=372 bgcolor=#d6d6d6
| 41372 ||  || — || January 5, 2000 || Socorro || LINEAR || EOS || align=right | 5.8 km || 
|-id=373 bgcolor=#d6d6d6
| 41373 ||  || — || January 5, 2000 || Socorro || LINEAR || — || align=right | 6.5 km || 
|-id=374 bgcolor=#E9E9E9
| 41374 ||  || — || January 5, 2000 || Socorro || LINEAR || RAF || align=right | 3.4 km || 
|-id=375 bgcolor=#d6d6d6
| 41375 ||  || — || January 5, 2000 || Socorro || LINEAR || EOS || align=right | 6.1 km || 
|-id=376 bgcolor=#d6d6d6
| 41376 ||  || — || January 5, 2000 || Socorro || LINEAR || EMA || align=right | 9.5 km || 
|-id=377 bgcolor=#d6d6d6
| 41377 ||  || — || January 5, 2000 || Socorro || LINEAR || — || align=right | 9.5 km || 
|-id=378 bgcolor=#d6d6d6
| 41378 ||  || — || January 5, 2000 || Socorro || LINEAR || — || align=right | 7.2 km || 
|-id=379 bgcolor=#C2FFFF
| 41379 ||  || — || January 5, 2000 || Socorro || LINEAR || L4 || align=right | 31 km || 
|-id=380 bgcolor=#d6d6d6
| 41380 ||  || — || January 5, 2000 || Socorro || LINEAR || — || align=right | 7.9 km || 
|-id=381 bgcolor=#E9E9E9
| 41381 ||  || — || January 5, 2000 || Socorro || LINEAR || CLO || align=right | 7.6 km || 
|-id=382 bgcolor=#d6d6d6
| 41382 ||  || — || January 5, 2000 || Socorro || LINEAR || URS || align=right | 11 km || 
|-id=383 bgcolor=#d6d6d6
| 41383 ||  || — || January 5, 2000 || Socorro || LINEAR || — || align=right | 14 km || 
|-id=384 bgcolor=#d6d6d6
| 41384 ||  || — || January 5, 2000 || Socorro || LINEAR || — || align=right | 11 km || 
|-id=385 bgcolor=#E9E9E9
| 41385 ||  || — || January 5, 2000 || Socorro || LINEAR || HNS || align=right | 4.5 km || 
|-id=386 bgcolor=#E9E9E9
| 41386 ||  || — || January 5, 2000 || Socorro || LINEAR || — || align=right | 7.4 km || 
|-id=387 bgcolor=#d6d6d6
| 41387 ||  || — || January 5, 2000 || Socorro || LINEAR || — || align=right | 3.8 km || 
|-id=388 bgcolor=#d6d6d6
| 41388 ||  || — || January 5, 2000 || Socorro || LINEAR || — || align=right | 9.0 km || 
|-id=389 bgcolor=#E9E9E9
| 41389 ||  || — || January 5, 2000 || Socorro || LINEAR || GEF || align=right | 3.9 km || 
|-id=390 bgcolor=#E9E9E9
| 41390 ||  || — || January 7, 2000 || Socorro || LINEAR || — || align=right | 7.0 km || 
|-id=391 bgcolor=#E9E9E9
| 41391 ||  || — || January 7, 2000 || Socorro || LINEAR || GEF || align=right | 5.0 km || 
|-id=392 bgcolor=#d6d6d6
| 41392 ||  || — || January 7, 2000 || Socorro || LINEAR || — || align=right | 9.9 km || 
|-id=393 bgcolor=#fefefe
| 41393 ||  || — || January 8, 2000 || Socorro || LINEAR || — || align=right | 3.0 km || 
|-id=394 bgcolor=#E9E9E9
| 41394 ||  || — || January 5, 2000 || Socorro || LINEAR || DOR || align=right | 8.9 km || 
|-id=395 bgcolor=#d6d6d6
| 41395 ||  || — || January 7, 2000 || Socorro || LINEAR || — || align=right | 8.5 km || 
|-id=396 bgcolor=#d6d6d6
| 41396 ||  || — || January 7, 2000 || Socorro || LINEAR || — || align=right | 7.4 km || 
|-id=397 bgcolor=#d6d6d6
| 41397 ||  || — || January 7, 2000 || Socorro || LINEAR || — || align=right | 20 km || 
|-id=398 bgcolor=#d6d6d6
| 41398 ||  || — || January 7, 2000 || Socorro || LINEAR || EOS || align=right | 6.5 km || 
|-id=399 bgcolor=#d6d6d6
| 41399 ||  || — || January 7, 2000 || Socorro || LINEAR || URS || align=right | 12 km || 
|-id=400 bgcolor=#E9E9E9
| 41400 ||  || — || January 8, 2000 || Socorro || LINEAR || — || align=right | 4.7 km || 
|}

41401–41500 

|-bgcolor=#d6d6d6
| 41401 ||  || — || January 8, 2000 || Socorro || LINEAR || — || align=right | 11 km || 
|-id=402 bgcolor=#d6d6d6
| 41402 ||  || — || January 8, 2000 || Socorro || LINEAR || — || align=right | 11 km || 
|-id=403 bgcolor=#d6d6d6
| 41403 ||  || — || January 8, 2000 || Socorro || LINEAR || — || align=right | 11 km || 
|-id=404 bgcolor=#E9E9E9
| 41404 ||  || — || January 8, 2000 || Socorro || LINEAR || — || align=right | 3.8 km || 
|-id=405 bgcolor=#d6d6d6
| 41405 ||  || — || January 8, 2000 || Socorro || LINEAR || — || align=right | 13 km || 
|-id=406 bgcolor=#d6d6d6
| 41406 ||  || — || January 8, 2000 || Socorro || LINEAR || — || align=right | 16 km || 
|-id=407 bgcolor=#E9E9E9
| 41407 ||  || — || January 8, 2000 || Socorro || LINEAR || — || align=right | 5.0 km || 
|-id=408 bgcolor=#d6d6d6
| 41408 ||  || — || January 8, 2000 || Socorro || LINEAR || — || align=right | 13 km || 
|-id=409 bgcolor=#E9E9E9
| 41409 ||  || — || January 9, 2000 || Socorro || LINEAR || MIT || align=right | 6.2 km || 
|-id=410 bgcolor=#E9E9E9
| 41410 ||  || — || January 9, 2000 || Socorro || LINEAR || WAT || align=right | 6.4 km || 
|-id=411 bgcolor=#E9E9E9
| 41411 ||  || — || January 9, 2000 || Socorro || LINEAR || — || align=right | 2.9 km || 
|-id=412 bgcolor=#E9E9E9
| 41412 ||  || — || January 9, 2000 || Socorro || LINEAR || MAR || align=right | 3.3 km || 
|-id=413 bgcolor=#d6d6d6
| 41413 ||  || — || January 5, 2000 || Kitt Peak || Spacewatch || — || align=right | 5.6 km || 
|-id=414 bgcolor=#d6d6d6
| 41414 ||  || — || January 7, 2000 || Kitt Peak || Spacewatch || — || align=right | 4.4 km || 
|-id=415 bgcolor=#d6d6d6
| 41415 ||  || — || January 4, 2000 || Anderson Mesa || LONEOS || — || align=right | 7.8 km || 
|-id=416 bgcolor=#E9E9E9
| 41416 ||  || — || January 4, 2000 || Anderson Mesa || LONEOS || — || align=right | 5.5 km || 
|-id=417 bgcolor=#C2FFFF
| 41417 ||  || — || January 4, 2000 || Kitt Peak || Spacewatch || L4 || align=right | 13 km || 
|-id=418 bgcolor=#d6d6d6
| 41418 ||  || — || January 5, 2000 || Socorro || LINEAR || BRA || align=right | 6.0 km || 
|-id=419 bgcolor=#d6d6d6
| 41419 ||  || — || January 5, 2000 || Socorro || LINEAR || 3:2 || align=right | 12 km || 
|-id=420 bgcolor=#E9E9E9
| 41420 ||  || — || January 7, 2000 || Anderson Mesa || LONEOS || EUN || align=right | 3.3 km || 
|-id=421 bgcolor=#E9E9E9
| 41421 ||  || — || January 7, 2000 || Anderson Mesa || LONEOS || MIT || align=right | 4.4 km || 
|-id=422 bgcolor=#d6d6d6
| 41422 ||  || — || February 2, 2000 || Socorro || LINEAR || — || align=right | 8.9 km || 
|-id=423 bgcolor=#fefefe
| 41423 ||  || — || February 2, 2000 || Socorro || LINEAR || — || align=right | 2.3 km || 
|-id=424 bgcolor=#fefefe
| 41424 ||  || — || February 4, 2000 || Socorro || LINEAR || H || align=right | 3.0 km || 
|-id=425 bgcolor=#fefefe
| 41425 ||  || — || February 10, 2000 || Višnjan Observatory || K. Korlević || V || align=right | 2.1 km || 
|-id=426 bgcolor=#C2FFFF
| 41426 ||  || — || February 5, 2000 || Kitt Peak || Spacewatch || L4 || align=right | 12 km || 
|-id=427 bgcolor=#C2FFFF
| 41427 ||  || — || February 28, 2000 || Socorro || LINEAR || L4 || align=right | 18 km || 
|-id=428 bgcolor=#fefefe
| 41428 ||  || — || March 8, 2000 || Socorro || LINEAR || V || align=right | 2.8 km || 
|-id=429 bgcolor=#FFC2E0
| 41429 ||  || — || April 3, 2000 || Socorro || LINEAR || APOPHA || align=right data-sort-value="0.2" | 200 m || 
|-id=430 bgcolor=#fefefe
| 41430 ||  || — || April 4, 2000 || Socorro || LINEAR || — || align=right | 4.8 km || 
|-id=431 bgcolor=#fefefe
| 41431 ||  || — || April 4, 2000 || Socorro || LINEAR || — || align=right | 2.1 km || 
|-id=432 bgcolor=#E9E9E9
| 41432 ||  || — || April 5, 2000 || Socorro || LINEAR || JUN || align=right | 3.0 km || 
|-id=433 bgcolor=#fefefe
| 41433 ||  || — || April 5, 2000 || Socorro || LINEAR || — || align=right | 2.6 km || 
|-id=434 bgcolor=#FA8072
| 41434 ||  || — || April 7, 2000 || Socorro || LINEAR || — || align=right | 1.2 km || 
|-id=435 bgcolor=#E9E9E9
| 41435 ||  || — || April 4, 2000 || Socorro || LINEAR || — || align=right | 3.7 km || 
|-id=436 bgcolor=#E9E9E9
| 41436 ||  || — || April 6, 2000 || Socorro || LINEAR || MAR || align=right | 4.1 km || 
|-id=437 bgcolor=#E9E9E9
| 41437 ||  || — || April 11, 2000 || Fountain Hills || C. W. Juels || EUN || align=right | 6.3 km || 
|-id=438 bgcolor=#fefefe
| 41438 ||  || — || April 7, 2000 || Socorro || LINEAR || — || align=right | 4.5 km || 
|-id=439 bgcolor=#fefefe
| 41439 ||  || — || April 8, 2000 || Socorro || LINEAR || FLO || align=right | 2.5 km || 
|-id=440 bgcolor=#FFC2E0
| 41440 ||  || — || April 27, 2000 || Anderson Mesa || LONEOS || AMO || align=right data-sort-value="0.39" | 390 m || 
|-id=441 bgcolor=#E9E9E9
| 41441 ||  || — || April 24, 2000 || Anderson Mesa || LONEOS || — || align=right | 4.0 km || 
|-id=442 bgcolor=#fefefe
| 41442 ||  || — || May 9, 2000 || Socorro || LINEAR || FLO || align=right | 3.8 km || 
|-id=443 bgcolor=#E9E9E9
| 41443 ||  || — || May 2, 2000 || Anderson Mesa || LONEOS || slow || align=right | 3.4 km || 
|-id=444 bgcolor=#d6d6d6
| 41444 ||  || — || May 6, 2000 || Socorro || LINEAR || — || align=right | 8.8 km || 
|-id=445 bgcolor=#fefefe
| 41445 ||  || — || May 27, 2000 || Socorro || LINEAR || NYS || align=right | 2.3 km || 
|-id=446 bgcolor=#E9E9E9
| 41446 || 2000 LW || — || June 1, 2000 || Kitt Peak || Spacewatch || GEF || align=right | 4.0 km || 
|-id=447 bgcolor=#E9E9E9
| 41447 ||  || — || June 4, 2000 || Socorro || LINEAR || — || align=right | 3.8 km || 
|-id=448 bgcolor=#E9E9E9
| 41448 ||  || — || June 4, 2000 || Socorro || LINEAR || GAL || align=right | 6.7 km || 
|-id=449 bgcolor=#fefefe
| 41449 ||  || — || June 5, 2000 || Socorro || LINEAR || — || align=right | 2.7 km || 
|-id=450 bgcolor=#fefefe
| 41450 Medkeff ||  ||  || June 1, 2000 || Anza || M. Collins, M. White || NYS || align=right | 1.5 km || 
|-id=451 bgcolor=#E9E9E9
| 41451 ||  || — || June 1, 2000 || Socorro || LINEAR || EUN || align=right | 4.3 km || 
|-id=452 bgcolor=#E9E9E9
| 41452 ||  || — || June 9, 2000 || Anderson Mesa || LONEOS || — || align=right | 3.4 km || 
|-id=453 bgcolor=#E9E9E9
| 41453 ||  || — || June 25, 2000 || Socorro || LINEAR || EUN || align=right | 5.6 km || 
|-id=454 bgcolor=#fefefe
| 41454 ||  || — || June 26, 2000 || Socorro || LINEAR || — || align=right | 1.9 km || 
|-id=455 bgcolor=#E9E9E9
| 41455 || 2000 NC || — || July 1, 2000 || Prescott || P. G. Comba || — || align=right | 4.6 km || 
|-id=456 bgcolor=#E9E9E9
| 41456 || 2000 NT || — || July 3, 2000 || Prescott || P. G. Comba || — || align=right | 5.0 km || 
|-id=457 bgcolor=#fefefe
| 41457 ||  || — || July 5, 2000 || Kitt Peak || Spacewatch || — || align=right | 2.2 km || 
|-id=458 bgcolor=#fefefe
| 41458 Ramanjooloo ||  ||  || July 5, 2000 || Anderson Mesa || LONEOS || ERI || align=right | 4.2 km || 
|-id=459 bgcolor=#E9E9E9
| 41459 ||  || — || July 6, 2000 || Kitt Peak || Spacewatch || — || align=right | 2.0 km || 
|-id=460 bgcolor=#d6d6d6
| 41460 ||  || — || July 3, 2000 || Socorro || LINEAR || — || align=right | 16 km || 
|-id=461 bgcolor=#E9E9E9
| 41461 || 2000 ON || — || July 23, 2000 || Socorro || LINEAR || Tj (2.81) || align=right | 6.8 km || 
|-id=462 bgcolor=#d6d6d6
| 41462 ||  || — || July 23, 2000 || Socorro || LINEAR || — || align=right | 9.0 km || 
|-id=463 bgcolor=#fefefe
| 41463 ||  || — || July 31, 2000 || Socorro || LINEAR || — || align=right | 2.6 km || 
|-id=464 bgcolor=#FA8072
| 41464 ||  || — || July 31, 2000 || Socorro || LINEAR || H || align=right | 1.7 km || 
|-id=465 bgcolor=#E9E9E9
| 41465 ||  || — || July 23, 2000 || Socorro || LINEAR || — || align=right | 3.8 km || 
|-id=466 bgcolor=#E9E9E9
| 41466 ||  || — || July 23, 2000 || Socorro || LINEAR || — || align=right | 4.1 km || 
|-id=467 bgcolor=#fefefe
| 41467 ||  || — || July 30, 2000 || Socorro || LINEAR || V || align=right | 1.9 km || 
|-id=468 bgcolor=#fefefe
| 41468 ||  || — || July 31, 2000 || Socorro || LINEAR || — || align=right | 2.5 km || 
|-id=469 bgcolor=#E9E9E9
| 41469 ||  || — || July 31, 2000 || Socorro || LINEAR || — || align=right | 2.7 km || 
|-id=470 bgcolor=#fefefe
| 41470 ||  || — || July 31, 2000 || Socorro || LINEAR || FLO || align=right | 1.8 km || 
|-id=471 bgcolor=#fefefe
| 41471 ||  || — || July 30, 2000 || Socorro || LINEAR || FLO || align=right | 2.2 km || 
|-id=472 bgcolor=#E9E9E9
| 41472 ||  || — || July 29, 2000 || Anderson Mesa || LONEOS || — || align=right | 3.8 km || 
|-id=473 bgcolor=#fefefe
| 41473 ||  || — || August 9, 2000 || Ondřejov || L. Kotková || NYS || align=right | 1.7 km || 
|-id=474 bgcolor=#fefefe
| 41474 ||  || — || August 1, 2000 || Socorro || LINEAR || FLO || align=right | 2.3 km || 
|-id=475 bgcolor=#FA8072
| 41475 ||  || — || August 1, 2000 || Socorro || LINEAR || — || align=right | 2.9 km || 
|-id=476 bgcolor=#E9E9E9
| 41476 ||  || — || August 1, 2000 || Socorro || LINEAR || — || align=right | 2.5 km || 
|-id=477 bgcolor=#E9E9E9
| 41477 ||  || — || August 5, 2000 || Haleakala || NEAT || — || align=right | 3.5 km || 
|-id=478 bgcolor=#fefefe
| 41478 ||  || — || August 3, 2000 || Socorro || LINEAR || V || align=right | 3.9 km || 
|-id=479 bgcolor=#fefefe
| 41479 ||  || — || August 24, 2000 || Socorro || LINEAR || — || align=right | 2.2 km || 
|-id=480 bgcolor=#d6d6d6
| 41480 ||  || — || August 25, 2000 || Socorro || LINEAR || HYG || align=right | 9.0 km || 
|-id=481 bgcolor=#fefefe
| 41481 Musashifuchu ||  ||  || August 28, 2000 || Bisei SG Center || BATTeRS || — || align=right | 2.8 km || 
|-id=482 bgcolor=#d6d6d6
| 41482 ||  || — || August 24, 2000 || Socorro || LINEAR || — || align=right | 7.5 km || 
|-id=483 bgcolor=#E9E9E9
| 41483 ||  || — || August 24, 2000 || Socorro || LINEAR || — || align=right | 5.4 km || 
|-id=484 bgcolor=#fefefe
| 41484 ||  || — || August 24, 2000 || Socorro || LINEAR || — || align=right | 2.2 km || 
|-id=485 bgcolor=#fefefe
| 41485 ||  || — || August 24, 2000 || Socorro || LINEAR || — || align=right | 2.3 km || 
|-id=486 bgcolor=#d6d6d6
| 41486 ||  || — || August 28, 2000 || Socorro || LINEAR || HYG || align=right | 6.9 km || 
|-id=487 bgcolor=#fefefe
| 41487 ||  || — || August 28, 2000 || Socorro || LINEAR || — || align=right | 2.4 km || 
|-id=488 bgcolor=#d6d6d6
| 41488 Sindbad ||  ||  || August 29, 2000 || Reedy Creek || J. Broughton || HIL3:2 || align=right | 18 km || 
|-id=489 bgcolor=#fefefe
| 41489 ||  || — || August 24, 2000 || Socorro || LINEAR || — || align=right | 1.3 km || 
|-id=490 bgcolor=#E9E9E9
| 41490 ||  || — || August 24, 2000 || Socorro || LINEAR || — || align=right | 4.0 km || 
|-id=491 bgcolor=#fefefe
| 41491 ||  || — || August 24, 2000 || Socorro || LINEAR || — || align=right | 2.1 km || 
|-id=492 bgcolor=#fefefe
| 41492 ||  || — || August 25, 2000 || Socorro || LINEAR || — || align=right | 2.9 km || 
|-id=493 bgcolor=#E9E9E9
| 41493 ||  || — || August 28, 2000 || Socorro || LINEAR || — || align=right | 2.7 km || 
|-id=494 bgcolor=#fefefe
| 41494 ||  || — || August 24, 2000 || Socorro || LINEAR || — || align=right | 2.1 km || 
|-id=495 bgcolor=#fefefe
| 41495 ||  || — || August 26, 2000 || Socorro || LINEAR || — || align=right | 2.6 km || 
|-id=496 bgcolor=#fefefe
| 41496 ||  || — || August 25, 2000 || Socorro || LINEAR || FLO || align=right | 2.4 km || 
|-id=497 bgcolor=#fefefe
| 41497 ||  || — || August 24, 2000 || Socorro || LINEAR || — || align=right | 2.5 km || 
|-id=498 bgcolor=#fefefe
| 41498 ||  || — || August 24, 2000 || Socorro || LINEAR || EUT || align=right | 2.2 km || 
|-id=499 bgcolor=#d6d6d6
| 41499 ||  || — || August 31, 2000 || Socorro || LINEAR || HYG || align=right | 6.3 km || 
|-id=500 bgcolor=#E9E9E9
| 41500 ||  || — || August 31, 2000 || Socorro || LINEAR || — || align=right | 4.3 km || 
|}

41501–41600 

|-bgcolor=#fefefe
| 41501 ||  || — || August 31, 2000 || Socorro || LINEAR || — || align=right | 2.8 km || 
|-id=502 bgcolor=#fefefe
| 41502 Denchukun ||  ||  || August 23, 2000 || Bisei SG Center || BATTeRS || — || align=right | 2.3 km || 
|-id=503 bgcolor=#FA8072
| 41503 ||  || — || August 26, 2000 || Kvistaberg || UDAS || H || align=right | 1.9 km || 
|-id=504 bgcolor=#fefefe
| 41504 ||  || — || August 29, 2000 || Siding Spring || R. H. McNaught || H || align=right | 1.1 km || 
|-id=505 bgcolor=#E9E9E9
| 41505 ||  || — || August 25, 2000 || Socorro || LINEAR || — || align=right | 3.3 km || 
|-id=506 bgcolor=#fefefe
| 41506 ||  || — || August 25, 2000 || Socorro || LINEAR || — || align=right | 2.5 km || 
|-id=507 bgcolor=#d6d6d6
| 41507 ||  || — || August 31, 2000 || Socorro || LINEAR || — || align=right | 8.7 km || 
|-id=508 bgcolor=#d6d6d6
| 41508 ||  || — || August 31, 2000 || Socorro || LINEAR || EOS || align=right | 5.0 km || 
|-id=509 bgcolor=#E9E9E9
| 41509 ||  || — || August 31, 2000 || Socorro || LINEAR || — || align=right | 3.3 km || 
|-id=510 bgcolor=#E9E9E9
| 41510 ||  || — || August 31, 2000 || Socorro || LINEAR || MAR || align=right | 4.8 km || 
|-id=511 bgcolor=#E9E9E9
| 41511 ||  || — || August 31, 2000 || Socorro || LINEAR || — || align=right | 6.7 km || 
|-id=512 bgcolor=#d6d6d6
| 41512 ||  || — || August 31, 2000 || Socorro || LINEAR || KOR || align=right | 2.9 km || 
|-id=513 bgcolor=#fefefe
| 41513 ||  || — || August 31, 2000 || Socorro || LINEAR || — || align=right | 2.9 km || 
|-id=514 bgcolor=#E9E9E9
| 41514 ||  || — || August 31, 2000 || Socorro || LINEAR || DOR || align=right | 9.8 km || 
|-id=515 bgcolor=#fefefe
| 41515 ||  || — || August 31, 2000 || Socorro || LINEAR || FLO || align=right | 1.9 km || 
|-id=516 bgcolor=#E9E9E9
| 41516 ||  || — || August 31, 2000 || Socorro || LINEAR || EUN || align=right | 4.1 km || 
|-id=517 bgcolor=#E9E9E9
| 41517 ||  || — || August 31, 2000 || Socorro || LINEAR || — || align=right | 3.3 km || 
|-id=518 bgcolor=#d6d6d6
| 41518 ||  || — || August 28, 2000 || Socorro || LINEAR || — || align=right | 7.0 km || 
|-id=519 bgcolor=#E9E9E9
| 41519 ||  || — || August 28, 2000 || Socorro || LINEAR || — || align=right | 4.1 km || 
|-id=520 bgcolor=#E9E9E9
| 41520 ||  || — || August 31, 2000 || Socorro || LINEAR || — || align=right | 2.4 km || 
|-id=521 bgcolor=#E9E9E9
| 41521 ||  || — || August 31, 2000 || Socorro || LINEAR || — || align=right | 2.9 km || 
|-id=522 bgcolor=#d6d6d6
| 41522 ||  || — || August 31, 2000 || Socorro || LINEAR || 628 || align=right | 3.6 km || 
|-id=523 bgcolor=#E9E9E9
| 41523 ||  || — || August 31, 2000 || Socorro || LINEAR || — || align=right | 4.5 km || 
|-id=524 bgcolor=#d6d6d6
| 41524 ||  || — || August 31, 2000 || Socorro || LINEAR || EOS || align=right | 5.5 km || 
|-id=525 bgcolor=#fefefe
| 41525 ||  || — || August 20, 2000 || Kitt Peak || Spacewatch || NYS || align=right | 3.8 km || 
|-id=526 bgcolor=#E9E9E9
| 41526 ||  || — || August 21, 2000 || Anderson Mesa || LONEOS || — || align=right | 2.9 km || 
|-id=527 bgcolor=#fefefe
| 41527 ||  || — || August 21, 2000 || Anderson Mesa || LONEOS || — || align=right | 2.4 km || 
|-id=528 bgcolor=#fefefe
| 41528 ||  || — || September 1, 2000 || Socorro || LINEAR || — || align=right | 2.8 km || 
|-id=529 bgcolor=#fefefe
| 41529 ||  || — || September 1, 2000 || Socorro || LINEAR || V || align=right | 1.9 km || 
|-id=530 bgcolor=#fefefe
| 41530 ||  || — || September 1, 2000 || Socorro || LINEAR || NYS || align=right | 2.4 km || 
|-id=531 bgcolor=#E9E9E9
| 41531 ||  || — || September 1, 2000 || Socorro || LINEAR || — || align=right | 3.3 km || 
|-id=532 bgcolor=#E9E9E9
| 41532 ||  || — || September 1, 2000 || Socorro || LINEAR || — || align=right | 2.8 km || 
|-id=533 bgcolor=#fefefe
| 41533 ||  || — || September 1, 2000 || Socorro || LINEAR || NYS || align=right | 2.3 km || 
|-id=534 bgcolor=#fefefe
| 41534 ||  || — || September 1, 2000 || Socorro || LINEAR || V || align=right | 2.8 km || 
|-id=535 bgcolor=#E9E9E9
| 41535 ||  || — || September 1, 2000 || Socorro || LINEAR || — || align=right | 4.6 km || 
|-id=536 bgcolor=#fefefe
| 41536 ||  || — || September 1, 2000 || Socorro || LINEAR || FLO || align=right | 2.0 km || 
|-id=537 bgcolor=#fefefe
| 41537 ||  || — || September 1, 2000 || Socorro || LINEAR || — || align=right | 2.3 km || 
|-id=538 bgcolor=#E9E9E9
| 41538 ||  || — || September 1, 2000 || Socorro || LINEAR || GER || align=right | 4.7 km || 
|-id=539 bgcolor=#fefefe
| 41539 ||  || — || September 1, 2000 || Socorro || LINEAR || — || align=right | 2.2 km || 
|-id=540 bgcolor=#E9E9E9
| 41540 ||  || — || September 4, 2000 || Socorro || LINEAR || — || align=right | 2.3 km || 
|-id=541 bgcolor=#fefefe
| 41541 ||  || — || September 5, 2000 || Socorro || LINEAR || — || align=right | 2.0 km || 
|-id=542 bgcolor=#fefefe
| 41542 ||  || — || September 5, 2000 || Socorro || LINEAR || — || align=right | 3.6 km || 
|-id=543 bgcolor=#E9E9E9
| 41543 ||  || — || September 3, 2000 || Socorro || LINEAR || EUN || align=right | 4.6 km || 
|-id=544 bgcolor=#E9E9E9
| 41544 ||  || — || September 3, 2000 || Socorro || LINEAR || — || align=right | 5.7 km || 
|-id=545 bgcolor=#E9E9E9
| 41545 ||  || — || September 3, 2000 || Socorro || LINEAR || — || align=right | 7.2 km || 
|-id=546 bgcolor=#fefefe
| 41546 ||  || — || September 3, 2000 || Socorro || LINEAR || FLO || align=right | 3.2 km || 
|-id=547 bgcolor=#fefefe
| 41547 ||  || — || September 3, 2000 || Socorro || LINEAR || V || align=right | 2.1 km || 
|-id=548 bgcolor=#E9E9E9
| 41548 ||  || — || September 3, 2000 || Socorro || LINEAR || — || align=right | 6.5 km || 
|-id=549 bgcolor=#fefefe
| 41549 ||  || — || September 3, 2000 || Socorro || LINEAR || — || align=right | 2.8 km || 
|-id=550 bgcolor=#fefefe
| 41550 ||  || — || September 3, 2000 || Socorro || LINEAR || — || align=right | 2.6 km || 
|-id=551 bgcolor=#fefefe
| 41551 ||  || — || September 5, 2000 || Socorro || LINEAR || — || align=right | 2.0 km || 
|-id=552 bgcolor=#fefefe
| 41552 ||  || — || September 1, 2000 || Socorro || LINEAR || — || align=right | 2.0 km || 
|-id=553 bgcolor=#E9E9E9
| 41553 ||  || — || September 1, 2000 || Socorro || LINEAR || — || align=right | 2.7 km || 
|-id=554 bgcolor=#d6d6d6
| 41554 ||  || — || September 5, 2000 || Višnjan Observatory || K. Korlević || — || align=right | 4.8 km || 
|-id=555 bgcolor=#fefefe
| 41555 ||  || — || September 1, 2000 || Socorro || LINEAR || — || align=right | 2.8 km || 
|-id=556 bgcolor=#fefefe
| 41556 ||  || — || September 1, 2000 || Socorro || LINEAR || — || align=right | 3.0 km || 
|-id=557 bgcolor=#fefefe
| 41557 ||  || — || September 1, 2000 || Socorro || LINEAR || — || align=right | 2.3 km || 
|-id=558 bgcolor=#fefefe
| 41558 ||  || — || September 7, 2000 || Kitt Peak || Spacewatch || V || align=right | 1.7 km || 
|-id=559 bgcolor=#fefefe
| 41559 ||  || — || September 8, 2000 || Višnjan Observatory || K. Korlević || — || align=right | 3.0 km || 
|-id=560 bgcolor=#fefefe
| 41560 ||  || — || September 1, 2000 || Socorro || LINEAR || — || align=right | 2.2 km || 
|-id=561 bgcolor=#fefefe
| 41561 ||  || — || September 1, 2000 || Socorro || LINEAR || FLO || align=right | 2.7 km || 
|-id=562 bgcolor=#fefefe
| 41562 ||  || — || September 1, 2000 || Socorro || LINEAR || NYS || align=right | 2.1 km || 
|-id=563 bgcolor=#E9E9E9
| 41563 ||  || — || September 2, 2000 || Socorro || LINEAR || — || align=right | 2.3 km || 
|-id=564 bgcolor=#fefefe
| 41564 ||  || — || September 2, 2000 || Socorro || LINEAR || — || align=right | 2.3 km || 
|-id=565 bgcolor=#fefefe
| 41565 ||  || — || September 2, 2000 || Socorro || LINEAR || — || align=right | 1.9 km || 
|-id=566 bgcolor=#fefefe
| 41566 ||  || — || September 2, 2000 || Socorro || LINEAR || — || align=right | 2.0 km || 
|-id=567 bgcolor=#d6d6d6
| 41567 ||  || — || September 2, 2000 || Socorro || LINEAR || — || align=right | 11 km || 
|-id=568 bgcolor=#fefefe
| 41568 ||  || — || September 2, 2000 || Socorro || LINEAR || V || align=right | 2.0 km || 
|-id=569 bgcolor=#fefefe
| 41569 ||  || — || September 2, 2000 || Socorro || LINEAR || FLO || align=right | 3.1 km || 
|-id=570 bgcolor=#fefefe
| 41570 ||  || — || September 3, 2000 || Socorro || LINEAR || V || align=right | 2.0 km || 
|-id=571 bgcolor=#fefefe
| 41571 ||  || — || September 1, 2000 || Socorro || LINEAR || — || align=right | 3.1 km || 
|-id=572 bgcolor=#fefefe
| 41572 ||  || — || September 3, 2000 || Socorro || LINEAR || V || align=right | 2.3 km || 
|-id=573 bgcolor=#E9E9E9
| 41573 ||  || — || September 5, 2000 || Anderson Mesa || LONEOS || — || align=right | 5.3 km || 
|-id=574 bgcolor=#FA8072
| 41574 ||  || — || September 19, 2000 || Socorro || LINEAR || H || align=right | 1.6 km || 
|-id=575 bgcolor=#fefefe
| 41575 ||  || — || September 20, 2000 || Desert Beaver || W. K. Y. Yeung || FLO || align=right | 1.9 km || 
|-id=576 bgcolor=#d6d6d6
| 41576 ||  || — || September 20, 2000 || Socorro || LINEAR || — || align=right | 10 km || 
|-id=577 bgcolor=#FA8072
| 41577 ||  || — || September 20, 2000 || Socorro || LINEAR || H || align=right | 3.4 km || 
|-id=578 bgcolor=#fefefe
| 41578 ||  || — || September 20, 2000 || Socorro || LINEAR || H || align=right | 1.4 km || 
|-id=579 bgcolor=#fefefe
| 41579 ||  || — || September 23, 2000 || Socorro || LINEAR || V || align=right | 2.2 km || 
|-id=580 bgcolor=#E9E9E9
| 41580 ||  || — || September 20, 2000 || Haleakala || NEAT || — || align=right | 3.4 km || 
|-id=581 bgcolor=#E9E9E9
| 41581 ||  || — || September 25, 2000 || Višnjan Observatory || K. Korlević || — || align=right | 2.6 km || 
|-id=582 bgcolor=#E9E9E9
| 41582 ||  || — || September 23, 2000 || Socorro || LINEAR || — || align=right | 7.0 km || 
|-id=583 bgcolor=#d6d6d6
| 41583 ||  || — || September 24, 2000 || Socorro || LINEAR || URS || align=right | 12 km || 
|-id=584 bgcolor=#d6d6d6
| 41584 ||  || — || September 24, 2000 || Socorro || LINEAR || KOR || align=right | 2.8 km || 
|-id=585 bgcolor=#d6d6d6
| 41585 ||  || — || September 24, 2000 || Socorro || LINEAR || HYG || align=right | 8.2 km || 
|-id=586 bgcolor=#fefefe
| 41586 ||  || — || September 24, 2000 || Socorro || LINEAR || V || align=right | 1.3 km || 
|-id=587 bgcolor=#fefefe
| 41587 ||  || — || September 24, 2000 || Socorro || LINEAR || ERI || align=right | 3.7 km || 
|-id=588 bgcolor=#FA8072
| 41588 ||  || — || September 22, 2000 || Socorro || LINEAR || — || align=right | 5.3 km || 
|-id=589 bgcolor=#E9E9E9
| 41589 ||  || — || September 22, 2000 || Socorro || LINEAR || MAR || align=right | 5.4 km || 
|-id=590 bgcolor=#E9E9E9
| 41590 ||  || — || September 23, 2000 || Socorro || LINEAR || — || align=right | 4.7 km || 
|-id=591 bgcolor=#E9E9E9
| 41591 ||  || — || September 23, 2000 || Socorro || LINEAR || — || align=right | 5.0 km || 
|-id=592 bgcolor=#E9E9E9
| 41592 ||  || — || September 24, 2000 || Socorro || LINEAR || AGN || align=right | 3.4 km || 
|-id=593 bgcolor=#d6d6d6
| 41593 ||  || — || September 24, 2000 || Socorro || LINEAR || KOR || align=right | 2.9 km || 
|-id=594 bgcolor=#fefefe
| 41594 ||  || — || September 24, 2000 || Socorro || LINEAR || — || align=right | 4.8 km || 
|-id=595 bgcolor=#fefefe
| 41595 ||  || — || September 24, 2000 || Socorro || LINEAR || NYS || align=right | 1.8 km || 
|-id=596 bgcolor=#E9E9E9
| 41596 ||  || — || September 24, 2000 || Socorro || LINEAR || — || align=right | 2.5 km || 
|-id=597 bgcolor=#fefefe
| 41597 ||  || — || September 24, 2000 || Socorro || LINEAR || — || align=right | 2.7 km || 
|-id=598 bgcolor=#fefefe
| 41598 ||  || — || September 24, 2000 || Socorro || LINEAR || — || align=right | 2.3 km || 
|-id=599 bgcolor=#E9E9E9
| 41599 ||  || — || September 24, 2000 || Socorro || LINEAR || — || align=right | 4.8 km || 
|-id=600 bgcolor=#fefefe
| 41600 ||  || — || September 24, 2000 || Socorro || LINEAR || FLO || align=right | 1.9 km || 
|}

41601–41700 

|-bgcolor=#fefefe
| 41601 ||  || — || September 24, 2000 || Socorro || LINEAR || — || align=right | 2.0 km || 
|-id=602 bgcolor=#fefefe
| 41602 ||  || — || September 24, 2000 || Socorro || LINEAR || — || align=right | 4.1 km || 
|-id=603 bgcolor=#fefefe
| 41603 ||  || — || September 24, 2000 || Socorro || LINEAR || — || align=right | 1.8 km || 
|-id=604 bgcolor=#fefefe
| 41604 ||  || — || September 24, 2000 || Socorro || LINEAR || NYS || align=right | 1.7 km || 
|-id=605 bgcolor=#fefefe
| 41605 ||  || — || September 24, 2000 || Socorro || LINEAR || FLO || align=right | 1.3 km || 
|-id=606 bgcolor=#fefefe
| 41606 ||  || — || September 24, 2000 || Socorro || LINEAR || NYS || align=right | 1.9 km || 
|-id=607 bgcolor=#fefefe
| 41607 ||  || — || September 24, 2000 || Socorro || LINEAR || — || align=right | 2.7 km || 
|-id=608 bgcolor=#E9E9E9
| 41608 ||  || — || September 24, 2000 || Socorro || LINEAR || — || align=right | 4.6 km || 
|-id=609 bgcolor=#fefefe
| 41609 ||  || — || September 24, 2000 || Socorro || LINEAR || slow? || align=right | 2.1 km || 
|-id=610 bgcolor=#fefefe
| 41610 ||  || — || September 24, 2000 || Socorro || LINEAR || FLO || align=right | 1.5 km || 
|-id=611 bgcolor=#E9E9E9
| 41611 ||  || — || September 24, 2000 || Socorro || LINEAR || — || align=right | 2.6 km || 
|-id=612 bgcolor=#d6d6d6
| 41612 ||  || — || September 24, 2000 || Socorro || LINEAR || — || align=right | 8.3 km || 
|-id=613 bgcolor=#d6d6d6
| 41613 ||  || — || September 24, 2000 || Socorro || LINEAR || HYG || align=right | 8.5 km || 
|-id=614 bgcolor=#fefefe
| 41614 ||  || — || September 24, 2000 || Socorro || LINEAR || FLO || align=right | 1.8 km || 
|-id=615 bgcolor=#fefefe
| 41615 ||  || — || September 24, 2000 || Socorro || LINEAR || FLO || align=right | 1.6 km || 
|-id=616 bgcolor=#fefefe
| 41616 ||  || — || September 24, 2000 || Socorro || LINEAR || FLO || align=right | 2.0 km || 
|-id=617 bgcolor=#fefefe
| 41617 ||  || — || September 24, 2000 || Socorro || LINEAR || — || align=right | 4.0 km || 
|-id=618 bgcolor=#fefefe
| 41618 ||  || — || September 24, 2000 || Socorro || LINEAR || NYS || align=right | 2.4 km || 
|-id=619 bgcolor=#fefefe
| 41619 ||  || — || September 24, 2000 || Socorro || LINEAR || — || align=right | 2.0 km || 
|-id=620 bgcolor=#E9E9E9
| 41620 ||  || — || September 27, 2000 || Socorro || LINEAR || — || align=right | 3.3 km || 
|-id=621 bgcolor=#fefefe
| 41621 ||  || — || September 20, 2000 || Haleakala || NEAT || — || align=right | 5.0 km || 
|-id=622 bgcolor=#fefefe
| 41622 ||  || — || September 23, 2000 || Socorro || LINEAR || — || align=right | 3.2 km || 
|-id=623 bgcolor=#E9E9E9
| 41623 ||  || — || September 23, 2000 || Socorro || LINEAR || JUN || align=right | 9.5 km || 
|-id=624 bgcolor=#fefefe
| 41624 ||  || — || September 23, 2000 || Socorro || LINEAR || — || align=right | 2.4 km || 
|-id=625 bgcolor=#fefefe
| 41625 ||  || — || September 23, 2000 || Socorro || LINEAR || FLO || align=right | 4.1 km || 
|-id=626 bgcolor=#d6d6d6
| 41626 ||  || — || September 24, 2000 || Socorro || LINEAR || — || align=right | 5.6 km || 
|-id=627 bgcolor=#E9E9E9
| 41627 ||  || — || September 24, 2000 || Socorro || LINEAR || PAD || align=right | 6.4 km || 
|-id=628 bgcolor=#fefefe
| 41628 ||  || — || September 28, 2000 || Socorro || LINEAR || V || align=right | 1.6 km || 
|-id=629 bgcolor=#E9E9E9
| 41629 ||  || — || September 28, 2000 || Socorro || LINEAR || — || align=right | 6.0 km || 
|-id=630 bgcolor=#fefefe
| 41630 ||  || — || September 21, 2000 || Kitt Peak || Spacewatch || NYS || align=right | 2.5 km || 
|-id=631 bgcolor=#fefefe
| 41631 ||  || — || September 21, 2000 || Kitt Peak || Spacewatch || — || align=right | 1.8 km || 
|-id=632 bgcolor=#d6d6d6
| 41632 ||  || — || September 24, 2000 || Socorro || LINEAR || KOR || align=right | 3.3 km || 
|-id=633 bgcolor=#fefefe
| 41633 ||  || — || September 26, 2000 || Socorro || LINEAR || V || align=right | 1.8 km || 
|-id=634 bgcolor=#E9E9E9
| 41634 ||  || — || September 26, 2000 || Socorro || LINEAR || — || align=right | 3.0 km || 
|-id=635 bgcolor=#fefefe
| 41635 ||  || — || September 26, 2000 || Socorro || LINEAR || — || align=right | 6.2 km || 
|-id=636 bgcolor=#E9E9E9
| 41636 ||  || — || September 26, 2000 || Socorro || LINEAR || — || align=right | 4.1 km || 
|-id=637 bgcolor=#fefefe
| 41637 ||  || — || September 27, 2000 || Socorro || LINEAR || V || align=right | 1.6 km || 
|-id=638 bgcolor=#fefefe
| 41638 ||  || — || September 27, 2000 || Socorro || LINEAR || — || align=right | 2.3 km || 
|-id=639 bgcolor=#fefefe
| 41639 ||  || — || September 27, 2000 || Socorro || LINEAR || — || align=right | 3.0 km || 
|-id=640 bgcolor=#E9E9E9
| 41640 ||  || — || September 27, 2000 || Socorro || LINEAR || — || align=right | 6.2 km || 
|-id=641 bgcolor=#fefefe
| 41641 ||  || — || September 28, 2000 || Socorro || LINEAR || NYS || align=right | 1.9 km || 
|-id=642 bgcolor=#fefefe
| 41642 ||  || — || September 28, 2000 || Socorro || LINEAR || — || align=right | 1.9 km || 
|-id=643 bgcolor=#fefefe
| 41643 ||  || — || September 27, 2000 || Socorro || LINEAR || FLO || align=right | 1.6 km || 
|-id=644 bgcolor=#E9E9E9
| 41644 ||  || — || September 27, 2000 || Socorro || LINEAR || — || align=right | 7.2 km || 
|-id=645 bgcolor=#E9E9E9
| 41645 ||  || — || September 27, 2000 || Socorro || LINEAR || — || align=right | 3.2 km || 
|-id=646 bgcolor=#fefefe
| 41646 ||  || — || September 28, 2000 || Socorro || LINEAR || FLO || align=right | 1.3 km || 
|-id=647 bgcolor=#fefefe
| 41647 ||  || — || September 28, 2000 || Socorro || LINEAR || — || align=right | 2.0 km || 
|-id=648 bgcolor=#E9E9E9
| 41648 ||  || — || September 30, 2000 || Socorro || LINEAR || RAF || align=right | 2.6 km || 
|-id=649 bgcolor=#fefefe
| 41649 ||  || — || September 30, 2000 || Socorro || LINEAR || NYS || align=right | 3.6 km || 
|-id=650 bgcolor=#fefefe
| 41650 ||  || — || September 29, 2000 || Haleakala || NEAT || — || align=right | 4.9 km || 
|-id=651 bgcolor=#E9E9E9
| 41651 ||  || — || September 27, 2000 || Socorro || LINEAR || — || align=right | 5.9 km || 
|-id=652 bgcolor=#fefefe
| 41652 ||  || — || September 27, 2000 || Socorro || LINEAR || — || align=right | 5.7 km || 
|-id=653 bgcolor=#fefefe
| 41653 ||  || — || September 27, 2000 || Socorro || LINEAR || Vfast? || align=right | 2.5 km || 
|-id=654 bgcolor=#fefefe
| 41654 ||  || — || September 27, 2000 || Socorro || LINEAR || — || align=right | 3.3 km || 
|-id=655 bgcolor=#fefefe
| 41655 ||  || — || September 28, 2000 || Socorro || LINEAR || — || align=right | 1.8 km || 
|-id=656 bgcolor=#E9E9E9
| 41656 ||  || — || September 28, 2000 || Socorro || LINEAR || — || align=right | 2.1 km || 
|-id=657 bgcolor=#d6d6d6
| 41657 ||  || — || September 30, 2000 || Socorro || LINEAR || — || align=right | 4.8 km || 
|-id=658 bgcolor=#E9E9E9
| 41658 ||  || — || September 26, 2000 || Socorro || LINEAR || EUN || align=right | 5.0 km || 
|-id=659 bgcolor=#E9E9E9
| 41659 ||  || — || September 24, 2000 || Haleakala || NEAT || — || align=right | 3.6 km || 
|-id=660 bgcolor=#fefefe
| 41660 ||  || — || September 20, 2000 || Socorro || LINEAR || H || align=right | 1.7 km || 
|-id=661 bgcolor=#fefefe
| 41661 ||  || — || September 22, 2000 || Anderson Mesa || LONEOS || — || align=right | 2.0 km || 
|-id=662 bgcolor=#fefefe
| 41662 || 2000 TB || — || October 1, 2000 || Desert Beaver || W. K. Y. Yeung || NYS || align=right | 2.2 km || 
|-id=663 bgcolor=#fefefe
| 41663 ||  || — || October 1, 2000 || Socorro || LINEAR || FLO || align=right | 1.3 km || 
|-id=664 bgcolor=#fefefe
| 41664 ||  || — || October 1, 2000 || Socorro || LINEAR || — || align=right | 1.5 km || 
|-id=665 bgcolor=#fefefe
| 41665 ||  || — || October 1, 2000 || Socorro || LINEAR || — || align=right | 1.8 km || 
|-id=666 bgcolor=#fefefe
| 41666 ||  || — || October 1, 2000 || Socorro || LINEAR || MAS || align=right | 1.9 km || 
|-id=667 bgcolor=#fefefe
| 41667 ||  || — || October 1, 2000 || Socorro || LINEAR || ERI || align=right | 5.5 km || 
|-id=668 bgcolor=#fefefe
| 41668 ||  || — || October 2, 2000 || Socorro || LINEAR || — || align=right | 3.0 km || 
|-id=669 bgcolor=#fefefe
| 41669 ||  || — || October 6, 2000 || Fountain Hills || C. W. Juels || — || align=right | 2.6 km || 
|-id=670 bgcolor=#d6d6d6
| 41670 ||  || — || October 3, 2000 || Socorro || LINEAR || — || align=right | 11 km || 
|-id=671 bgcolor=#d6d6d6
| 41671 ||  || — || October 2, 2000 || Anderson Mesa || LONEOS || TIR || align=right | 6.8 km || 
|-id=672 bgcolor=#fefefe
| 41672 ||  || — || October 15, 2000 || Fountain Hills || C. W. Juels || H || align=right | 2.5 km || 
|-id=673 bgcolor=#E9E9E9
| 41673 ||  || — || October 1, 2000 || Socorro || LINEAR || EUN || align=right | 2.8 km || 
|-id=674 bgcolor=#fefefe
| 41674 ||  || — || October 2, 2000 || Socorro || LINEAR || NYS || align=right | 1.6 km || 
|-id=675 bgcolor=#fefefe
| 41675 ||  || — || October 22, 2000 || Višnjan Observatory || K. Korlević || — || align=right | 3.7 km || 
|-id=676 bgcolor=#fefefe
| 41676 ||  || — || October 24, 2000 || Desert Beaver || W. K. Y. Yeung || — || align=right | 2.9 km || 
|-id=677 bgcolor=#fefefe
| 41677 ||  || — || October 24, 2000 || Socorro || LINEAR || — || align=right | 5.3 km || 
|-id=678 bgcolor=#fefefe
| 41678 ||  || — || October 24, 2000 || Socorro || LINEAR || MAS || align=right | 2.3 km || 
|-id=679 bgcolor=#fefefe
| 41679 ||  || — || October 24, 2000 || Socorro || LINEAR || — || align=right | 5.3 km || 
|-id=680 bgcolor=#E9E9E9
| 41680 ||  || — || October 24, 2000 || Socorro || LINEAR || — || align=right | 6.6 km || 
|-id=681 bgcolor=#E9E9E9
| 41681 ||  || — || October 24, 2000 || Socorro || LINEAR || — || align=right | 2.8 km || 
|-id=682 bgcolor=#d6d6d6
| 41682 ||  || — || October 24, 2000 || Socorro || LINEAR || VER || align=right | 8.8 km || 
|-id=683 bgcolor=#fefefe
| 41683 ||  || — || October 25, 2000 || Socorro || LINEAR || V || align=right | 1.4 km || 
|-id=684 bgcolor=#fefefe
| 41684 ||  || — || October 25, 2000 || Desert Beaver || W. K. Y. Yeung || NYS || align=right | 4.7 km || 
|-id=685 bgcolor=#fefefe
| 41685 ||  || — || October 29, 2000 || Socorro || LINEAR || H || align=right | 1.8 km || 
|-id=686 bgcolor=#E9E9E9
| 41686 ||  || — || October 29, 2000 || Fountain Hills || C. W. Juels || — || align=right | 4.3 km || 
|-id=687 bgcolor=#fefefe
| 41687 ||  || — || October 30, 2000 || Oaxaca || J. M. Roe || FLO || align=right | 1.8 km || 
|-id=688 bgcolor=#d6d6d6
| 41688 ||  || — || October 25, 2000 || Socorro || LINEAR || EOS || align=right | 5.6 km || 
|-id=689 bgcolor=#fefefe
| 41689 ||  || — || October 25, 2000 || Socorro || LINEAR || — || align=right | 2.4 km || 
|-id=690 bgcolor=#fefefe
| 41690 ||  || — || October 29, 2000 || Socorro || LINEAR || PHO || align=right | 3.8 km || 
|-id=691 bgcolor=#E9E9E9
| 41691 ||  || — || October 24, 2000 || Socorro || LINEAR || — || align=right | 2.4 km || 
|-id=692 bgcolor=#fefefe
| 41692 ||  || — || October 24, 2000 || Socorro || LINEAR || V || align=right | 2.0 km || 
|-id=693 bgcolor=#fefefe
| 41693 ||  || — || October 24, 2000 || Socorro || LINEAR || — || align=right | 2.4 km || 
|-id=694 bgcolor=#E9E9E9
| 41694 ||  || — || October 24, 2000 || Socorro || LINEAR || — || align=right | 5.7 km || 
|-id=695 bgcolor=#E9E9E9
| 41695 ||  || — || October 24, 2000 || Socorro || LINEAR || — || align=right | 2.7 km || 
|-id=696 bgcolor=#fefefe
| 41696 ||  || — || October 24, 2000 || Socorro || LINEAR || — || align=right | 2.2 km || 
|-id=697 bgcolor=#fefefe
| 41697 ||  || — || October 24, 2000 || Socorro || LINEAR || NYS || align=right | 1.8 km || 
|-id=698 bgcolor=#fefefe
| 41698 ||  || — || October 24, 2000 || Socorro || LINEAR || V || align=right | 1.8 km || 
|-id=699 bgcolor=#fefefe
| 41699 ||  || — || October 24, 2000 || Socorro || LINEAR || FLO || align=right | 1.9 km || 
|-id=700 bgcolor=#E9E9E9
| 41700 ||  || — || October 24, 2000 || Socorro || LINEAR || — || align=right | 3.7 km || 
|}

41701–41800 

|-bgcolor=#E9E9E9
| 41701 ||  || — || October 24, 2000 || Socorro || LINEAR || VIB || align=right | 1.9 km || 
|-id=702 bgcolor=#d6d6d6
| 41702 ||  || — || October 24, 2000 || Socorro || LINEAR || THM || align=right | 5.9 km || 
|-id=703 bgcolor=#fefefe
| 41703 ||  || — || October 24, 2000 || Socorro || LINEAR || V || align=right | 2.7 km || 
|-id=704 bgcolor=#fefefe
| 41704 ||  || — || October 24, 2000 || Socorro || LINEAR || V || align=right | 1.9 km || 
|-id=705 bgcolor=#fefefe
| 41705 ||  || — || October 24, 2000 || Socorro || LINEAR || — || align=right | 3.5 km || 
|-id=706 bgcolor=#fefefe
| 41706 ||  || — || October 24, 2000 || Socorro || LINEAR || V || align=right | 1.8 km || 
|-id=707 bgcolor=#fefefe
| 41707 ||  || — || October 24, 2000 || Socorro || LINEAR || ERI || align=right | 5.9 km || 
|-id=708 bgcolor=#E9E9E9
| 41708 ||  || — || October 24, 2000 || Socorro || LINEAR || — || align=right | 4.5 km || 
|-id=709 bgcolor=#E9E9E9
| 41709 ||  || — || October 24, 2000 || Socorro || LINEAR || GER || align=right | 7.5 km || 
|-id=710 bgcolor=#fefefe
| 41710 ||  || — || October 25, 2000 || Socorro || LINEAR || FLO || align=right | 1.7 km || 
|-id=711 bgcolor=#fefefe
| 41711 ||  || — || October 25, 2000 || Socorro || LINEAR || KLI || align=right | 5.2 km || 
|-id=712 bgcolor=#fefefe
| 41712 ||  || — || October 25, 2000 || Socorro || LINEAR || FLO || align=right | 3.1 km || 
|-id=713 bgcolor=#fefefe
| 41713 ||  || — || October 25, 2000 || Socorro || LINEAR || — || align=right | 2.0 km || 
|-id=714 bgcolor=#fefefe
| 41714 ||  || — || October 25, 2000 || Socorro || LINEAR || V || align=right | 1.6 km || 
|-id=715 bgcolor=#fefefe
| 41715 ||  || — || October 26, 2000 || Socorro || LINEAR || NYS || align=right | 1.4 km || 
|-id=716 bgcolor=#fefefe
| 41716 ||  || — || October 29, 2000 || Desert Beaver || W. K. Y. Yeung || — || align=right | 2.1 km || 
|-id=717 bgcolor=#E9E9E9
| 41717 ||  || — || October 24, 2000 || Socorro || LINEAR || — || align=right | 2.7 km || 
|-id=718 bgcolor=#fefefe
| 41718 ||  || — || October 24, 2000 || Socorro || LINEAR || — || align=right | 2.2 km || 
|-id=719 bgcolor=#fefefe
| 41719 ||  || — || October 24, 2000 || Socorro || LINEAR || V || align=right | 2.1 km || 
|-id=720 bgcolor=#fefefe
| 41720 ||  || — || October 24, 2000 || Socorro || LINEAR || V || align=right | 2.1 km || 
|-id=721 bgcolor=#fefefe
| 41721 ||  || — || October 24, 2000 || Socorro || LINEAR || FLO || align=right | 2.3 km || 
|-id=722 bgcolor=#fefefe
| 41722 ||  || — || October 24, 2000 || Socorro || LINEAR || — || align=right | 5.2 km || 
|-id=723 bgcolor=#fefefe
| 41723 ||  || — || October 24, 2000 || Socorro || LINEAR || — || align=right | 2.2 km || 
|-id=724 bgcolor=#fefefe
| 41724 ||  || — || October 31, 2000 || Socorro || LINEAR || — || align=right | 2.0 km || 
|-id=725 bgcolor=#fefefe
| 41725 ||  || — || October 31, 2000 || Socorro || LINEAR || — || align=right | 2.5 km || 
|-id=726 bgcolor=#fefefe
| 41726 ||  || — || October 25, 2000 || Socorro || LINEAR || — || align=right | 1.6 km || 
|-id=727 bgcolor=#fefefe
| 41727 ||  || — || October 25, 2000 || Socorro || LINEAR || — || align=right | 2.0 km || 
|-id=728 bgcolor=#fefefe
| 41728 ||  || — || October 25, 2000 || Socorro || LINEAR || — || align=right | 2.3 km || 
|-id=729 bgcolor=#fefefe
| 41729 ||  || — || October 25, 2000 || Socorro || LINEAR || V || align=right | 1.4 km || 
|-id=730 bgcolor=#fefefe
| 41730 ||  || — || October 25, 2000 || Socorro || LINEAR || — || align=right | 2.0 km || 
|-id=731 bgcolor=#fefefe
| 41731 ||  || — || October 25, 2000 || Socorro || LINEAR || — || align=right | 1.9 km || 
|-id=732 bgcolor=#E9E9E9
| 41732 ||  || — || October 25, 2000 || Socorro || LINEAR || — || align=right | 3.1 km || 
|-id=733 bgcolor=#fefefe
| 41733 ||  || — || October 25, 2000 || Socorro || LINEAR || — || align=right | 2.6 km || 
|-id=734 bgcolor=#fefefe
| 41734 ||  || — || October 25, 2000 || Socorro || LINEAR || — || align=right | 2.7 km || 
|-id=735 bgcolor=#E9E9E9
| 41735 ||  || — || October 25, 2000 || Socorro || LINEAR || — || align=right | 3.1 km || 
|-id=736 bgcolor=#fefefe
| 41736 ||  || — || October 25, 2000 || Socorro || LINEAR || — || align=right | 3.0 km || 
|-id=737 bgcolor=#fefefe
| 41737 ||  || — || October 25, 2000 || Socorro || LINEAR || V || align=right | 2.3 km || 
|-id=738 bgcolor=#fefefe
| 41738 ||  || — || October 25, 2000 || Socorro || LINEAR || — || align=right | 2.5 km || 
|-id=739 bgcolor=#E9E9E9
| 41739 ||  || — || October 25, 2000 || Kitt Peak || Spacewatch || — || align=right | 5.9 km || 
|-id=740 bgcolor=#fefefe
| 41740 Yuenkwokyung || 2000 VC ||  || November 1, 2000 || Desert Beaver || W. K. Y. Yeung || FLO || align=right | 2.7 km || 
|-id=741 bgcolor=#fefefe
| 41741 || 2000 VG || — || November 1, 2000 || Desert Beaver || W. K. Y. Yeung || — || align=right | 2.0 km || 
|-id=742 bgcolor=#fefefe
| 41742 Wongkakui ||  ||  || November 1, 2000 || Desert Beaver || W. K. Y. Yeung || — || align=right | 4.3 km || 
|-id=743 bgcolor=#fefefe
| 41743 ||  || — || November 1, 2000 || Socorro || LINEAR || FLO || align=right | 2.0 km || 
|-id=744 bgcolor=#fefefe
| 41744 ||  || — || November 1, 2000 || Socorro || LINEAR || — || align=right | 2.2 km || 
|-id=745 bgcolor=#fefefe
| 41745 ||  || — || November 1, 2000 || Socorro || LINEAR || — || align=right | 2.6 km || 
|-id=746 bgcolor=#fefefe
| 41746 ||  || — || November 1, 2000 || Socorro || LINEAR || CLA || align=right | 5.0 km || 
|-id=747 bgcolor=#fefefe
| 41747 ||  || — || November 1, 2000 || Socorro || LINEAR || — || align=right | 1.8 km || 
|-id=748 bgcolor=#fefefe
| 41748 ||  || — || November 1, 2000 || Socorro || LINEAR || FLO || align=right | 2.5 km || 
|-id=749 bgcolor=#fefefe
| 41749 ||  || — || November 1, 2000 || Socorro || LINEAR || NYS || align=right | 2.0 km || 
|-id=750 bgcolor=#fefefe
| 41750 ||  || — || November 1, 2000 || Socorro || LINEAR || V || align=right | 2.1 km || 
|-id=751 bgcolor=#fefefe
| 41751 ||  || — || November 1, 2000 || Socorro || LINEAR || V || align=right | 2.4 km || 
|-id=752 bgcolor=#E9E9E9
| 41752 ||  || — || November 1, 2000 || Socorro || LINEAR || — || align=right | 7.3 km || 
|-id=753 bgcolor=#fefefe
| 41753 ||  || — || November 1, 2000 || Socorro || LINEAR || — || align=right | 2.8 km || 
|-id=754 bgcolor=#d6d6d6
| 41754 ||  || — || November 1, 2000 || Socorro || LINEAR || — || align=right | 7.1 km || 
|-id=755 bgcolor=#E9E9E9
| 41755 ||  || — || November 1, 2000 || Socorro || LINEAR || — || align=right | 2.5 km || 
|-id=756 bgcolor=#E9E9E9
| 41756 ||  || — || November 1, 2000 || Socorro || LINEAR || NEM || align=right | 3.4 km || 
|-id=757 bgcolor=#fefefe
| 41757 ||  || — || November 1, 2000 || Socorro || LINEAR || NYS || align=right | 1.9 km || 
|-id=758 bgcolor=#fefefe
| 41758 ||  || — || November 1, 2000 || Socorro || LINEAR || — || align=right | 2.6 km || 
|-id=759 bgcolor=#E9E9E9
| 41759 ||  || — || November 1, 2000 || Socorro || LINEAR || — || align=right | 2.5 km || 
|-id=760 bgcolor=#fefefe
| 41760 ||  || — || November 1, 2000 || Socorro || LINEAR || — || align=right | 3.4 km || 
|-id=761 bgcolor=#fefefe
| 41761 ||  || — || November 1, 2000 || Socorro || LINEAR || — || align=right | 2.3 km || 
|-id=762 bgcolor=#E9E9E9
| 41762 ||  || — || November 1, 2000 || Socorro || LINEAR || — || align=right | 2.7 km || 
|-id=763 bgcolor=#fefefe
| 41763 ||  || — || November 1, 2000 || Socorro || LINEAR || V || align=right | 1.8 km || 
|-id=764 bgcolor=#fefefe
| 41764 ||  || — || November 1, 2000 || Socorro || LINEAR || NYS || align=right | 2.5 km || 
|-id=765 bgcolor=#fefefe
| 41765 ||  || — || November 1, 2000 || Socorro || LINEAR || — || align=right | 2.1 km || 
|-id=766 bgcolor=#E9E9E9
| 41766 ||  || — || November 1, 2000 || Socorro || LINEAR || — || align=right | 6.1 km || 
|-id=767 bgcolor=#E9E9E9
| 41767 ||  || — || November 1, 2000 || Socorro || LINEAR || — || align=right | 4.7 km || 
|-id=768 bgcolor=#E9E9E9
| 41768 ||  || — || November 1, 2000 || Socorro || LINEAR || — || align=right | 3.6 km || 
|-id=769 bgcolor=#E9E9E9
| 41769 ||  || — || November 1, 2000 || Socorro || LINEAR || EUN || align=right | 3.4 km || 
|-id=770 bgcolor=#fefefe
| 41770 ||  || — || November 1, 2000 || Socorro || LINEAR || — || align=right | 3.2 km || 
|-id=771 bgcolor=#fefefe
| 41771 ||  || — || November 1, 2000 || Socorro || LINEAR || NYS || align=right | 2.0 km || 
|-id=772 bgcolor=#fefefe
| 41772 ||  || — || November 1, 2000 || Socorro || LINEAR || NYS || align=right | 1.6 km || 
|-id=773 bgcolor=#fefefe
| 41773 ||  || — || November 1, 2000 || Socorro || LINEAR || — || align=right | 3.1 km || 
|-id=774 bgcolor=#fefefe
| 41774 ||  || — || November 2, 2000 || Socorro || LINEAR || — || align=right | 3.1 km || 
|-id=775 bgcolor=#fefefe
| 41775 ||  || — || November 2, 2000 || Socorro || LINEAR || NYS || align=right | 2.1 km || 
|-id=776 bgcolor=#fefefe
| 41776 ||  || — || November 3, 2000 || Socorro || LINEAR || — || align=right | 2.0 km || 
|-id=777 bgcolor=#fefefe
| 41777 ||  || — || November 3, 2000 || Socorro || LINEAR || V || align=right | 1.8 km || 
|-id=778 bgcolor=#fefefe
| 41778 ||  || — || November 2, 2000 || Socorro || LINEAR || — || align=right | 2.3 km || 
|-id=779 bgcolor=#fefefe
| 41779 ||  || — || November 2, 2000 || Socorro || LINEAR || — || align=right | 1.9 km || 
|-id=780 bgcolor=#fefefe
| 41780 ||  || — || November 3, 2000 || Socorro || LINEAR || V || align=right | 1.9 km || 
|-id=781 bgcolor=#fefefe
| 41781 ||  || — || November 3, 2000 || Socorro || LINEAR || — || align=right | 2.2 km || 
|-id=782 bgcolor=#E9E9E9
| 41782 ||  || — || November 3, 2000 || Socorro || LINEAR || GEF || align=right | 3.2 km || 
|-id=783 bgcolor=#fefefe
| 41783 ||  || — || November 3, 2000 || Socorro || LINEAR || FLO || align=right | 2.6 km || 
|-id=784 bgcolor=#E9E9E9
| 41784 ||  || — || November 3, 2000 || Socorro || LINEAR || — || align=right | 2.7 km || 
|-id=785 bgcolor=#fefefe
| 41785 ||  || — || November 3, 2000 || Socorro || LINEAR || — || align=right | 3.8 km || 
|-id=786 bgcolor=#E9E9E9
| 41786 ||  || — || November 3, 2000 || Socorro || LINEAR || ADE || align=right | 6.5 km || 
|-id=787 bgcolor=#E9E9E9
| 41787 ||  || — || November 3, 2000 || Socorro || LINEAR || — || align=right | 5.6 km || 
|-id=788 bgcolor=#fefefe
| 41788 ||  || — || November 1, 2000 || Socorro || LINEAR || NYS || align=right | 2.1 km || 
|-id=789 bgcolor=#fefefe
| 41789 ||  || — || November 1, 2000 || Socorro || LINEAR || V || align=right | 3.5 km || 
|-id=790 bgcolor=#E9E9E9
| 41790 ||  || — || November 17, 2000 || Kitt Peak || Spacewatch || HEN || align=right | 2.5 km || 
|-id=791 bgcolor=#fefefe
| 41791 ||  || — || November 19, 2000 || Fountain Hills || C. W. Juels || — || align=right | 2.7 km || 
|-id=792 bgcolor=#fefefe
| 41792 ||  || — || November 19, 2000 || Socorro || LINEAR || PHO || align=right | 2.9 km || 
|-id=793 bgcolor=#fefefe
| 41793 ||  || — || November 19, 2000 || Socorro || LINEAR || — || align=right | 3.4 km || 
|-id=794 bgcolor=#fefefe
| 41794 ||  || — || November 24, 2000 || Elmira || A. J. Cecce || — || align=right | 6.2 km || 
|-id=795 bgcolor=#d6d6d6
| 41795 Wiens ||  ||  || November 22, 2000 || Haleakala || NEAT || — || align=right | 8.4 km || 
|-id=796 bgcolor=#E9E9E9
| 41796 ||  || — || November 21, 2000 || Socorro || LINEAR || — || align=right | 2.6 km || 
|-id=797 bgcolor=#d6d6d6
| 41797 ||  || — || November 21, 2000 || Socorro || LINEAR || KOR || align=right | 3.9 km || 
|-id=798 bgcolor=#fefefe
| 41798 ||  || — || November 21, 2000 || Socorro || LINEAR || V || align=right | 1.9 km || 
|-id=799 bgcolor=#d6d6d6
| 41799 ||  || — || November 25, 2000 || Fountain Hills || C. W. Juels || — || align=right | 10 km || 
|-id=800 bgcolor=#E9E9E9
| 41800 Robwilliams ||  ||  || November 25, 2000 || Fountain Hills || C. W. Juels || — || align=right | 8.1 km || 
|}

41801–41900 

|-bgcolor=#fefefe
| 41801 ||  || — || November 20, 2000 || Socorro || LINEAR || — || align=right | 1.5 km || 
|-id=802 bgcolor=#fefefe
| 41802 ||  || — || November 20, 2000 || Socorro || LINEAR || V || align=right | 2.3 km || 
|-id=803 bgcolor=#fefefe
| 41803 ||  || — || November 20, 2000 || Socorro || LINEAR || V || align=right | 1.5 km || 
|-id=804 bgcolor=#E9E9E9
| 41804 ||  || — || November 23, 2000 || Haleakala || NEAT || MIT || align=right | 5.2 km || 
|-id=805 bgcolor=#E9E9E9
| 41805 ||  || — || November 20, 2000 || Socorro || LINEAR || RAF || align=right | 2.1 km || 
|-id=806 bgcolor=#E9E9E9
| 41806 ||  || — || November 20, 2000 || Socorro || LINEAR || GEF || align=right | 2.9 km || 
|-id=807 bgcolor=#fefefe
| 41807 ||  || — || November 20, 2000 || Socorro || LINEAR || V || align=right | 1.4 km || 
|-id=808 bgcolor=#fefefe
| 41808 ||  || — || November 20, 2000 || Socorro || LINEAR || FLO || align=right | 2.3 km || 
|-id=809 bgcolor=#E9E9E9
| 41809 ||  || — || November 20, 2000 || Socorro || LINEAR || — || align=right | 2.8 km || 
|-id=810 bgcolor=#d6d6d6
| 41810 ||  || — || November 20, 2000 || Socorro || LINEAR || — || align=right | 3.2 km || 
|-id=811 bgcolor=#E9E9E9
| 41811 ||  || — || November 20, 2000 || Socorro || LINEAR || — || align=right | 2.3 km || 
|-id=812 bgcolor=#fefefe
| 41812 ||  || — || November 20, 2000 || Socorro || LINEAR || V || align=right | 1.6 km || 
|-id=813 bgcolor=#E9E9E9
| 41813 ||  || — || November 20, 2000 || Socorro || LINEAR || MRX || align=right | 6.1 km || 
|-id=814 bgcolor=#fefefe
| 41814 ||  || — || November 20, 2000 || Socorro || LINEAR || — || align=right | 2.8 km || 
|-id=815 bgcolor=#fefefe
| 41815 ||  || — || November 20, 2000 || Socorro || LINEAR || V || align=right | 2.2 km || 
|-id=816 bgcolor=#fefefe
| 41816 ||  || — || November 20, 2000 || Socorro || LINEAR || — || align=right | 2.1 km || 
|-id=817 bgcolor=#fefefe
| 41817 ||  || — || November 20, 2000 || Socorro || LINEAR || — || align=right | 3.5 km || 
|-id=818 bgcolor=#E9E9E9
| 41818 ||  || — || November 20, 2000 || Socorro || LINEAR || — || align=right | 3.3 km || 
|-id=819 bgcolor=#E9E9E9
| 41819 ||  || — || November 21, 2000 || Socorro || LINEAR || DOR || align=right | 7.3 km || 
|-id=820 bgcolor=#fefefe
| 41820 ||  || — || November 21, 2000 || Socorro || LINEAR || — || align=right | 1.9 km || 
|-id=821 bgcolor=#fefefe
| 41821 ||  || — || November 21, 2000 || Socorro || LINEAR || — || align=right | 2.2 km || 
|-id=822 bgcolor=#fefefe
| 41822 ||  || — || November 21, 2000 || Socorro || LINEAR || V || align=right | 2.3 km || 
|-id=823 bgcolor=#E9E9E9
| 41823 ||  || — || November 21, 2000 || Socorro || LINEAR || — || align=right | 3.8 km || 
|-id=824 bgcolor=#E9E9E9
| 41824 ||  || — || November 21, 2000 || Socorro || LINEAR || RAF || align=right | 2.8 km || 
|-id=825 bgcolor=#E9E9E9
| 41825 ||  || — || November 21, 2000 || Socorro || LINEAR || — || align=right | 5.4 km || 
|-id=826 bgcolor=#fefefe
| 41826 ||  || — || November 21, 2000 || Socorro || LINEAR || — || align=right | 2.8 km || 
|-id=827 bgcolor=#E9E9E9
| 41827 ||  || — || November 21, 2000 || Socorro || LINEAR || — || align=right | 4.1 km || 
|-id=828 bgcolor=#E9E9E9
| 41828 ||  || — || November 26, 2000 || Socorro || LINEAR || — || align=right | 5.0 km || 
|-id=829 bgcolor=#fefefe
| 41829 ||  || — || November 27, 2000 || Kitt Peak || Spacewatch || NYS || align=right | 1.4 km || 
|-id=830 bgcolor=#fefefe
| 41830 ||  || — || November 21, 2000 || Socorro || LINEAR || V || align=right | 3.6 km || 
|-id=831 bgcolor=#fefefe
| 41831 ||  || — || November 21, 2000 || Socorro || LINEAR || NYS || align=right | 2.2 km || 
|-id=832 bgcolor=#E9E9E9
| 41832 ||  || — || November 21, 2000 || Socorro || LINEAR || — || align=right | 5.8 km || 
|-id=833 bgcolor=#E9E9E9
| 41833 ||  || — || November 21, 2000 || Socorro || LINEAR || — || align=right | 4.2 km || 
|-id=834 bgcolor=#d6d6d6
| 41834 ||  || — || November 21, 2000 || Socorro || LINEAR || — || align=right | 7.1 km || 
|-id=835 bgcolor=#fefefe
| 41835 ||  || — || November 21, 2000 || Socorro || LINEAR || MAS || align=right | 2.5 km || 
|-id=836 bgcolor=#fefefe
| 41836 ||  || — || November 21, 2000 || Socorro || LINEAR || — || align=right | 3.1 km || 
|-id=837 bgcolor=#E9E9E9
| 41837 ||  || — || November 21, 2000 || Socorro || LINEAR || — || align=right | 3.0 km || 
|-id=838 bgcolor=#E9E9E9
| 41838 ||  || — || November 21, 2000 || Socorro || LINEAR || — || align=right | 5.7 km || 
|-id=839 bgcolor=#E9E9E9
| 41839 ||  || — || November 21, 2000 || Socorro || LINEAR || — || align=right | 3.0 km || 
|-id=840 bgcolor=#E9E9E9
| 41840 ||  || — || November 21, 2000 || Socorro || LINEAR || — || align=right | 2.8 km || 
|-id=841 bgcolor=#E9E9E9
| 41841 ||  || — || November 21, 2000 || Socorro || LINEAR || — || align=right | 3.1 km || 
|-id=842 bgcolor=#E9E9E9
| 41842 ||  || — || November 21, 2000 || Socorro || LINEAR || MAR || align=right | 4.7 km || 
|-id=843 bgcolor=#fefefe
| 41843 ||  || — || November 19, 2000 || Socorro || LINEAR || — || align=right | 2.5 km || 
|-id=844 bgcolor=#E9E9E9
| 41844 ||  || — || November 19, 2000 || Socorro || LINEAR || — || align=right | 3.1 km || 
|-id=845 bgcolor=#E9E9E9
| 41845 ||  || — || November 20, 2000 || Socorro || LINEAR || NEM || align=right | 5.0 km || 
|-id=846 bgcolor=#E9E9E9
| 41846 ||  || — || November 20, 2000 || Socorro || LINEAR || — || align=right | 2.7 km || 
|-id=847 bgcolor=#fefefe
| 41847 ||  || — || November 20, 2000 || Socorro || LINEAR || — || align=right | 2.9 km || 
|-id=848 bgcolor=#fefefe
| 41848 ||  || — || November 20, 2000 || Socorro || LINEAR || — || align=right | 2.9 km || 
|-id=849 bgcolor=#fefefe
| 41849 ||  || — || November 20, 2000 || Socorro || LINEAR || V || align=right | 2.9 km || 
|-id=850 bgcolor=#fefefe
| 41850 ||  || — || November 20, 2000 || Socorro || LINEAR || FLO || align=right | 2.0 km || 
|-id=851 bgcolor=#fefefe
| 41851 ||  || — || November 20, 2000 || Socorro || LINEAR || — || align=right | 2.6 km || 
|-id=852 bgcolor=#d6d6d6
| 41852 ||  || — || November 20, 2000 || Socorro || LINEAR || TIR || align=right | 5.4 km || 
|-id=853 bgcolor=#fefefe
| 41853 ||  || — || November 20, 2000 || Socorro || LINEAR || FLO || align=right | 3.6 km || 
|-id=854 bgcolor=#fefefe
| 41854 ||  || — || November 20, 2000 || Socorro || LINEAR || V || align=right | 2.3 km || 
|-id=855 bgcolor=#E9E9E9
| 41855 ||  || — || November 21, 2000 || Socorro || LINEAR || — || align=right | 2.7 km || 
|-id=856 bgcolor=#d6d6d6
| 41856 ||  || — || November 21, 2000 || Socorro || LINEAR || — || align=right | 3.7 km || 
|-id=857 bgcolor=#fefefe
| 41857 ||  || — || November 21, 2000 || Socorro || LINEAR || — || align=right | 1.9 km || 
|-id=858 bgcolor=#E9E9E9
| 41858 ||  || — || November 21, 2000 || Socorro || LINEAR || MIS || align=right | 7.7 km || 
|-id=859 bgcolor=#E9E9E9
| 41859 ||  || — || November 21, 2000 || Socorro || LINEAR || — || align=right | 2.7 km || 
|-id=860 bgcolor=#fefefe
| 41860 ||  || — || November 21, 2000 || Socorro || LINEAR || FLO || align=right | 2.2 km || 
|-id=861 bgcolor=#E9E9E9
| 41861 ||  || — || November 21, 2000 || Socorro || LINEAR || — || align=right | 2.2 km || 
|-id=862 bgcolor=#E9E9E9
| 41862 ||  || — || November 21, 2000 || Socorro || LINEAR || — || align=right | 5.6 km || 
|-id=863 bgcolor=#E9E9E9
| 41863 ||  || — || November 21, 2000 || Socorro || LINEAR || — || align=right | 2.9 km || 
|-id=864 bgcolor=#fefefe
| 41864 ||  || — || November 21, 2000 || Socorro || LINEAR || NYS || align=right | 5.3 km || 
|-id=865 bgcolor=#E9E9E9
| 41865 ||  || — || November 21, 2000 || Socorro || LINEAR || WIT || align=right | 4.4 km || 
|-id=866 bgcolor=#fefefe
| 41866 ||  || — || November 21, 2000 || Socorro || LINEAR || V || align=right | 2.5 km || 
|-id=867 bgcolor=#E9E9E9
| 41867 ||  || — || November 21, 2000 || Socorro || LINEAR || HEN || align=right | 2.3 km || 
|-id=868 bgcolor=#E9E9E9
| 41868 ||  || — || November 21, 2000 || Socorro || LINEAR || — || align=right | 4.4 km || 
|-id=869 bgcolor=#d6d6d6
| 41869 ||  || — || November 21, 2000 || Socorro || LINEAR || — || align=right | 6.4 km || 
|-id=870 bgcolor=#fefefe
| 41870 ||  || — || November 21, 2000 || Socorro || LINEAR || — || align=right | 2.0 km || 
|-id=871 bgcolor=#fefefe
| 41871 ||  || — || November 21, 2000 || Socorro || LINEAR || — || align=right | 2.0 km || 
|-id=872 bgcolor=#E9E9E9
| 41872 ||  || — || November 21, 2000 || Socorro || LINEAR || — || align=right | 2.8 km || 
|-id=873 bgcolor=#fefefe
| 41873 ||  || — || November 21, 2000 || Socorro || LINEAR || — || align=right | 1.6 km || 
|-id=874 bgcolor=#d6d6d6
| 41874 ||  || — || November 21, 2000 || Socorro || LINEAR || — || align=right | 8.0 km || 
|-id=875 bgcolor=#fefefe
| 41875 ||  || — || November 21, 2000 || Socorro || LINEAR || — || align=right | 3.8 km || 
|-id=876 bgcolor=#fefefe
| 41876 ||  || — || November 21, 2000 || Socorro || LINEAR || — || align=right | 3.0 km || 
|-id=877 bgcolor=#E9E9E9
| 41877 ||  || — || November 26, 2000 || Socorro || LINEAR || — || align=right | 5.9 km || 
|-id=878 bgcolor=#d6d6d6
| 41878 ||  || — || November 27, 2000 || Socorro || LINEAR || — || align=right | 7.8 km || 
|-id=879 bgcolor=#fefefe
| 41879 ||  || — || November 28, 2000 || Socorro || LINEAR || — || align=right | 2.6 km || 
|-id=880 bgcolor=#fefefe
| 41880 ||  || — || November 20, 2000 || Socorro || LINEAR || V || align=right | 1.9 km || 
|-id=881 bgcolor=#E9E9E9
| 41881 ||  || — || November 20, 2000 || Socorro || LINEAR || — || align=right | 3.2 km || 
|-id=882 bgcolor=#E9E9E9
| 41882 ||  || — || November 20, 2000 || Socorro || LINEAR || — || align=right | 2.5 km || 
|-id=883 bgcolor=#fefefe
| 41883 ||  || — || November 20, 2000 || Socorro || LINEAR || — || align=right | 2.9 km || 
|-id=884 bgcolor=#E9E9E9
| 41884 ||  || — || November 20, 2000 || Socorro || LINEAR || — || align=right | 3.4 km || 
|-id=885 bgcolor=#E9E9E9
| 41885 ||  || — || November 20, 2000 || Socorro || LINEAR || PAD || align=right | 5.2 km || 
|-id=886 bgcolor=#fefefe
| 41886 ||  || — || November 20, 2000 || Socorro || LINEAR || — || align=right | 2.4 km || 
|-id=887 bgcolor=#fefefe
| 41887 ||  || — || November 20, 2000 || Socorro || LINEAR || NYS || align=right | 2.1 km || 
|-id=888 bgcolor=#fefefe
| 41888 ||  || — || November 20, 2000 || Socorro || LINEAR || — || align=right | 3.2 km || 
|-id=889 bgcolor=#fefefe
| 41889 ||  || — || November 20, 2000 || Socorro || LINEAR || NYS || align=right | 2.2 km || 
|-id=890 bgcolor=#fefefe
| 41890 ||  || — || November 20, 2000 || Socorro || LINEAR || — || align=right | 4.5 km || 
|-id=891 bgcolor=#d6d6d6
| 41891 ||  || — || November 20, 2000 || Socorro || LINEAR || — || align=right | 7.8 km || 
|-id=892 bgcolor=#E9E9E9
| 41892 ||  || — || November 20, 2000 || Socorro || LINEAR || — || align=right | 5.7 km || 
|-id=893 bgcolor=#fefefe
| 41893 ||  || — || November 20, 2000 || Socorro || LINEAR || — || align=right | 2.5 km || 
|-id=894 bgcolor=#fefefe
| 41894 ||  || — || November 21, 2000 || Socorro || LINEAR || V || align=right | 2.3 km || 
|-id=895 bgcolor=#E9E9E9
| 41895 ||  || — || November 21, 2000 || Socorro || LINEAR || — || align=right | 5.7 km || 
|-id=896 bgcolor=#E9E9E9
| 41896 ||  || — || November 29, 2000 || Socorro || LINEAR || — || align=right | 2.8 km || 
|-id=897 bgcolor=#E9E9E9
| 41897 ||  || — || November 29, 2000 || Socorro || LINEAR || — || align=right | 2.8 km || 
|-id=898 bgcolor=#E9E9E9
| 41898 ||  || — || November 19, 2000 || Socorro || LINEAR || — || align=right | 3.2 km || 
|-id=899 bgcolor=#d6d6d6
| 41899 ||  || — || November 27, 2000 || Haleakala || NEAT || — || align=right | 14 km || 
|-id=900 bgcolor=#fefefe
| 41900 ||  || — || November 16, 2000 || Kitt Peak || Spacewatch || V || align=right | 2.1 km || 
|}

41901–42000 

|-bgcolor=#fefefe
| 41901 ||  || — || November 17, 2000 || Kitt Peak || Spacewatch || — || align=right | 2.4 km || 
|-id=902 bgcolor=#d6d6d6
| 41902 ||  || — || November 18, 2000 || Desert Beaver || W. K. Y. Yeung || — || align=right | 8.3 km || 
|-id=903 bgcolor=#fefefe
| 41903 ||  || — || November 18, 2000 || Kitt Peak || Spacewatch || FLO || align=right | 1.5 km || 
|-id=904 bgcolor=#d6d6d6
| 41904 ||  || — || November 19, 2000 || Kitt Peak || Spacewatch || HYG || align=right | 6.9 km || 
|-id=905 bgcolor=#fefefe
| 41905 ||  || — || November 19, 2000 || Socorro || LINEAR || — || align=right | 2.6 km || 
|-id=906 bgcolor=#d6d6d6
| 41906 ||  || — || November 19, 2000 || Socorro || LINEAR || URS || align=right | 7.6 km || 
|-id=907 bgcolor=#E9E9E9
| 41907 ||  || — || November 20, 2000 || Anderson Mesa || LONEOS || MAR || align=right | 3.1 km || 
|-id=908 bgcolor=#fefefe
| 41908 ||  || — || November 20, 2000 || Socorro || LINEAR || FLO || align=right | 1.7 km || 
|-id=909 bgcolor=#E9E9E9
| 41909 ||  || — || November 19, 2000 || Socorro || LINEAR || DOR || align=right | 9.3 km || 
|-id=910 bgcolor=#fefefe
| 41910 ||  || — || November 19, 2000 || Socorro || LINEAR || — || align=right | 2.9 km || 
|-id=911 bgcolor=#fefefe
| 41911 ||  || — || November 20, 2000 || Anderson Mesa || LONEOS || — || align=right | 5.4 km || 
|-id=912 bgcolor=#fefefe
| 41912 ||  || — || November 21, 2000 || Socorro || LINEAR || — || align=right | 2.2 km || 
|-id=913 bgcolor=#E9E9E9
| 41913 ||  || — || November 29, 2000 || Haleakala || NEAT || — || align=right | 3.2 km || 
|-id=914 bgcolor=#E9E9E9
| 41914 ||  || — || November 29, 2000 || Haleakala || NEAT || JUN || align=right | 4.3 km || 
|-id=915 bgcolor=#fefefe
| 41915 ||  || — || November 27, 2000 || Socorro || LINEAR || — || align=right | 2.9 km || 
|-id=916 bgcolor=#fefefe
| 41916 ||  || — || November 29, 2000 || Socorro || LINEAR || — || align=right | 3.0 km || 
|-id=917 bgcolor=#fefefe
| 41917 ||  || — || November 29, 2000 || Socorro || LINEAR || slow? || align=right | 2.2 km || 
|-id=918 bgcolor=#fefefe
| 41918 ||  || — || November 30, 2000 || Socorro || LINEAR || — || align=right | 4.0 km || 
|-id=919 bgcolor=#d6d6d6
| 41919 ||  || — || November 30, 2000 || Socorro || LINEAR || — || align=right | 5.8 km || 
|-id=920 bgcolor=#fefefe
| 41920 ||  || — || November 30, 2000 || Socorro || LINEAR || — || align=right | 2.9 km || 
|-id=921 bgcolor=#E9E9E9
| 41921 ||  || — || November 30, 2000 || Socorro || LINEAR || — || align=right | 3.6 km || 
|-id=922 bgcolor=#fefefe
| 41922 ||  || — || November 30, 2000 || Haleakala || NEAT || FLO || align=right | 3.2 km || 
|-id=923 bgcolor=#E9E9E9
| 41923 ||  || — || November 19, 2000 || Socorro || LINEAR || EUN || align=right | 4.5 km || 
|-id=924 bgcolor=#E9E9E9
| 41924 ||  || — || November 20, 2000 || Anderson Mesa || LONEOS || — || align=right | 3.2 km || 
|-id=925 bgcolor=#E9E9E9
| 41925 ||  || — || November 20, 2000 || Anderson Mesa || LONEOS || MAR || align=right | 3.6 km || 
|-id=926 bgcolor=#fefefe
| 41926 ||  || — || November 20, 2000 || Anderson Mesa || LONEOS || — || align=right | 2.2 km || 
|-id=927 bgcolor=#d6d6d6
| 41927 Bonal ||  ||  || November 24, 2000 || Anderson Mesa || LONEOS || THM || align=right | 4.9 km || 
|-id=928 bgcolor=#E9E9E9
| 41928 ||  || — || November 25, 2000 || Socorro || LINEAR || — || align=right | 2.7 km || 
|-id=929 bgcolor=#E9E9E9
| 41929 ||  || — || November 26, 2000 || Socorro || LINEAR || — || align=right | 2.8 km || 
|-id=930 bgcolor=#d6d6d6
| 41930 ||  || — || November 26, 2000 || Socorro || LINEAR || SAN || align=right | 3.9 km || 
|-id=931 bgcolor=#fefefe
| 41931 ||  || — || November 27, 2000 || Socorro || LINEAR || FLO || align=right | 2.3 km || 
|-id=932 bgcolor=#E9E9E9
| 41932 ||  || — || November 28, 2000 || Kitt Peak || Spacewatch || PAD || align=right | 6.6 km || 
|-id=933 bgcolor=#fefefe
| 41933 ||  || — || November 26, 2000 || Socorro || LINEAR || — || align=right | 3.9 km || 
|-id=934 bgcolor=#E9E9E9
| 41934 ||  || — || November 26, 2000 || Socorro || LINEAR || — || align=right | 6.1 km || 
|-id=935 bgcolor=#E9E9E9
| 41935 ||  || — || November 26, 2000 || Socorro || LINEAR || MAR || align=right | 4.3 km || 
|-id=936 bgcolor=#fefefe
| 41936 ||  || — || November 27, 2000 || Socorro || LINEAR || — || align=right | 1.9 km || 
|-id=937 bgcolor=#E9E9E9
| 41937 ||  || — || November 29, 2000 || Socorro || LINEAR || — || align=right | 4.4 km || 
|-id=938 bgcolor=#E9E9E9
| 41938 ||  || — || November 29, 2000 || Socorro || LINEAR || — || align=right | 2.1 km || 
|-id=939 bgcolor=#E9E9E9
| 41939 ||  || — || November 27, 2000 || Socorro || LINEAR || — || align=right | 2.9 km || 
|-id=940 bgcolor=#E9E9E9
| 41940 ||  || — || November 18, 2000 || Anderson Mesa || LONEOS || AGN || align=right | 2.7 km || 
|-id=941 bgcolor=#E9E9E9
| 41941 || 2000 XF || — || December 2, 2000 || Oaxaca || J. M. Roe || — || align=right | 3.4 km || 
|-id=942 bgcolor=#E9E9E9
| 41942 ||  || — || December 3, 2000 || Kitt Peak || Spacewatch || — || align=right | 3.8 km || 
|-id=943 bgcolor=#E9E9E9
| 41943 Fredrick ||  ||  || December 3, 2000 || Olathe || L. Robinson || — || align=right | 4.1 km || 
|-id=944 bgcolor=#E9E9E9
| 41944 ||  || — || December 1, 2000 || Socorro || LINEAR || EUN || align=right | 2.7 km || 
|-id=945 bgcolor=#E9E9E9
| 41945 ||  || — || December 1, 2000 || Socorro || LINEAR || — || align=right | 3.8 km || 
|-id=946 bgcolor=#E9E9E9
| 41946 ||  || — || December 1, 2000 || Socorro || LINEAR || — || align=right | 5.6 km || 
|-id=947 bgcolor=#fefefe
| 41947 ||  || — || December 1, 2000 || Socorro || LINEAR || — || align=right | 3.4 km || 
|-id=948 bgcolor=#E9E9E9
| 41948 ||  || — || December 1, 2000 || Socorro || LINEAR || — || align=right | 3.5 km || 
|-id=949 bgcolor=#fefefe
| 41949 ||  || — || December 1, 2000 || Socorro || LINEAR || — || align=right | 2.8 km || 
|-id=950 bgcolor=#E9E9E9
| 41950 ||  || — || December 1, 2000 || Socorro || LINEAR || — || align=right | 3.1 km || 
|-id=951 bgcolor=#E9E9E9
| 41951 ||  || — || December 1, 2000 || Socorro || LINEAR || HNS || align=right | 3.9 km || 
|-id=952 bgcolor=#d6d6d6
| 41952 ||  || — || December 1, 2000 || Haleakala || NEAT || TIR || align=right | 10 km || 
|-id=953 bgcolor=#d6d6d6
| 41953 ||  || — || December 1, 2000 || Socorro || LINEAR || EOS || align=right | 4.9 km || 
|-id=954 bgcolor=#fefefe
| 41954 ||  || — || December 4, 2000 || Socorro || LINEAR || V || align=right | 1.4 km || 
|-id=955 bgcolor=#E9E9E9
| 41955 ||  || — || December 4, 2000 || Socorro || LINEAR || RAF || align=right | 3.0 km || 
|-id=956 bgcolor=#d6d6d6
| 41956 ||  || — || December 4, 2000 || Socorro || LINEAR || EOS || align=right | 5.0 km || 
|-id=957 bgcolor=#fefefe
| 41957 ||  || — || December 4, 2000 || Socorro || LINEAR || — || align=right | 2.4 km || 
|-id=958 bgcolor=#E9E9E9
| 41958 ||  || — || December 4, 2000 || Socorro || LINEAR || MAR || align=right | 3.0 km || 
|-id=959 bgcolor=#E9E9E9
| 41959 ||  || — || December 4, 2000 || Socorro || LINEAR || — || align=right | 3.9 km || 
|-id=960 bgcolor=#d6d6d6
| 41960 ||  || — || December 4, 2000 || Socorro || LINEAR || — || align=right | 6.9 km || 
|-id=961 bgcolor=#fefefe
| 41961 ||  || — || December 4, 2000 || Socorro || LINEAR || V || align=right | 2.0 km || 
|-id=962 bgcolor=#E9E9E9
| 41962 ||  || — || December 4, 2000 || Socorro || LINEAR || — || align=right | 3.4 km || 
|-id=963 bgcolor=#E9E9E9
| 41963 ||  || — || December 5, 2000 || Socorro || LINEAR || — || align=right | 3.8 km || 
|-id=964 bgcolor=#E9E9E9
| 41964 ||  || — || December 5, 2000 || Socorro || LINEAR || — || align=right | 6.3 km || 
|-id=965 bgcolor=#E9E9E9
| 41965 ||  || — || December 5, 2000 || Socorro || LINEAR || — || align=right | 4.4 km || 
|-id=966 bgcolor=#E9E9E9
| 41966 ||  || — || December 5, 2000 || Socorro || LINEAR || MAR || align=right | 3.7 km || 
|-id=967 bgcolor=#E9E9E9
| 41967 ||  || — || December 4, 2000 || Socorro || LINEAR || EUN || align=right | 2.6 km || 
|-id=968 bgcolor=#E9E9E9
| 41968 ||  || — || December 6, 2000 || Socorro || LINEAR || GEF || align=right | 3.8 km || 
|-id=969 bgcolor=#fefefe
| 41969 || 2000 YX || — || December 17, 2000 || Kitt Peak || Spacewatch || MAS || align=right | 2.9 km || 
|-id=970 bgcolor=#fefefe
| 41970 ||  || — || December 18, 2000 || Kitt Peak || Spacewatch || — || align=right | 2.2 km || 
|-id=971 bgcolor=#E9E9E9
| 41971 ||  || — || December 20, 2000 || Socorro || LINEAR || — || align=right | 4.4 km || 
|-id=972 bgcolor=#d6d6d6
| 41972 ||  || — || December 17, 2000 || Kitt Peak || Spacewatch || — || align=right | 4.0 km || 
|-id=973 bgcolor=#E9E9E9
| 41973 ||  || — || December 19, 2000 || Haleakala || NEAT || — || align=right | 7.5 km || 
|-id=974 bgcolor=#E9E9E9
| 41974 ||  || — || December 19, 2000 || Haleakala || NEAT || — || align=right | 4.3 km || 
|-id=975 bgcolor=#E9E9E9
| 41975 ||  || — || December 23, 2000 || Desert Beaver || W. K. Y. Yeung || — || align=right | 4.3 km || 
|-id=976 bgcolor=#fefefe
| 41976 ||  || — || December 21, 2000 || Uccle || T. Pauwels || FLO || align=right | 2.3 km || 
|-id=977 bgcolor=#fefefe
| 41977 ||  || — || December 22, 2000 || Anderson Mesa || LONEOS || — || align=right | 5.6 km || 
|-id=978 bgcolor=#E9E9E9
| 41978 ||  || — || December 22, 2000 || Anderson Mesa || LONEOS || — || align=right | 4.4 km || 
|-id=979 bgcolor=#d6d6d6
| 41979 Lelumacri ||  ||  || December 22, 2000 || Gnosca || S. Sposetti || — || align=right | 5.2 km || 
|-id=980 bgcolor=#fefefe
| 41980 ||  || — || December 20, 2000 || Socorro || LINEAR || V || align=right | 2.0 km || 
|-id=981 bgcolor=#E9E9E9
| 41981 Yaobeina ||  ||  || December 28, 2000 || Desert Beaver || W. K. Y. Yeung || — || align=right | 4.4 km || 
|-id=982 bgcolor=#fefefe
| 41982 ||  || — || December 29, 2000 || Desert Beaver || W. K. Y. Yeung || FLO || align=right | 2.3 km || 
|-id=983 bgcolor=#E9E9E9
| 41983 ||  || — || December 28, 2000 || Socorro || LINEAR || — || align=right | 2.9 km || 
|-id=984 bgcolor=#E9E9E9
| 41984 ||  || — || December 28, 2000 || Socorro || LINEAR || — || align=right | 8.5 km || 
|-id=985 bgcolor=#fefefe
| 41985 ||  || — || December 29, 2000 || Anderson Mesa || LONEOS || — || align=right | 2.4 km || 
|-id=986 bgcolor=#E9E9E9
| 41986 Fort Bend ||  ||  || December 29, 2000 || Needville || Needville Obs. || — || align=right | 2.8 km || 
|-id=987 bgcolor=#E9E9E9
| 41987 ||  || — || December 27, 2000 || Oizumi || T. Kobayashi || MAR || align=right | 4.7 km || 
|-id=988 bgcolor=#d6d6d6
| 41988 Emilyjoseph ||  ||  || December 27, 2000 || Kitt Peak || Spacewatch || KOR || align=right | 3.1 km || 
|-id=989 bgcolor=#E9E9E9
| 41989 ||  || — || December 28, 2000 || Socorro || LINEAR || — || align=right | 3.3 km || 
|-id=990 bgcolor=#E9E9E9
| 41990 ||  || — || December 28, 2000 || Socorro || LINEAR || — || align=right | 3.5 km || 
|-id=991 bgcolor=#d6d6d6
| 41991 ||  || — || December 28, 2000 || Socorro || LINEAR || AEG || align=right | 12 km || 
|-id=992 bgcolor=#E9E9E9
| 41992 ||  || — || December 30, 2000 || Socorro || LINEAR || — || align=right | 2.4 km || 
|-id=993 bgcolor=#d6d6d6
| 41993 ||  || — || December 30, 2000 || Socorro || LINEAR || 7:4 || align=right | 7.7 km || 
|-id=994 bgcolor=#E9E9E9
| 41994 ||  || — || December 30, 2000 || Socorro || LINEAR || — || align=right | 4.4 km || 
|-id=995 bgcolor=#E9E9E9
| 41995 ||  || — || December 30, 2000 || Socorro || LINEAR || — || align=right | 3.0 km || 
|-id=996 bgcolor=#fefefe
| 41996 ||  || — || December 30, 2000 || Socorro || LINEAR || FLO || align=right | 2.0 km || 
|-id=997 bgcolor=#d6d6d6
| 41997 ||  || — || December 30, 2000 || Socorro || LINEAR || KOR || align=right | 3.5 km || 
|-id=998 bgcolor=#d6d6d6
| 41998 ||  || — || December 30, 2000 || Socorro || LINEAR || EMA || align=right | 8.4 km || 
|-id=999 bgcolor=#fefefe
| 41999 ||  || — || December 30, 2000 || Socorro || LINEAR || — || align=right | 3.1 km || 
|-id=000 bgcolor=#E9E9E9
| 42000 ||  || — || December 30, 2000 || Socorro || LINEAR || GEF || align=right | 2.9 km || 
|}

References

External links 
 Discovery Circumstances: Numbered Minor Planets (40001)–(45000) (IAU Minor Planet Center)

0041